The following is a list of all butterflies found in the Indochinese biogeographic region (Thailand, Laos and Vietnam, Cambodia, Myanmar (formerly Burma; part of British India until 1937), Peninsular Malaysia and Singapore in the Indomalayan realm).

The climate of Indochina is subtropical in the north, tropical further south. Indochinese terrestrial ecoregions include the Northeast India–Myanmar pine forests, Northern Triangle temperate forests, Myanmar Coast mangroves, Chin Hills–Arakan Yoma montane forests, Mizoram–Manipur–Kachin rain forests, Northern Indochina subtropical moist forests, Irrawaddy dry forests, Irrawaddy freshwater swamp forests, Irrawaddy moist deciduous forests, Cardamom Mountains rain forests, Chao Phraya freshwater swamp forests, Kayah–Karen montane rain forests, Northern Indochina subtropical forests, Northern Khorat Plateau moist deciduous forests, Northern Thailand–Laos moist deciduous forests, Peninsular Malaysian montane rain forests, Peninsular Malaysian peat swamp forests, and Tenasserim–South Thailand semi-evergreen rain forests.

The butterfly fauna of Indochina includes Indo-Burmese genera with a species-richness (a count of species within the genus) generally distributed from Assam to Sundaland (Sunda Islands), genera with a strong centre of species-richness in western China and the eastern Himalaya, genera with their greatest species-richness in Sundaland west of the Wallace Line and species endemic to Indochina.

Family Hesperiidae 

subfamily: Coeliadinae

genus: Badamia
Badamia exclamationis (Fabricius, 1775) – brown awl

genus: Bibasis
Bibasis jaina
Bibasis jaina jaina (Moore, 1865)
Bibasis jaina margana Fruhstorfer, 1911
Bibasis jaina velva (Evans, 1932)
Bibasis anadi (de Niceville, [1884])
Bibasis anadi anadi (de Niceville, [1884])
Bibasis anadi owstoni (Eliot, 1980)
Bibasis oedipodea (Swainson, 1820) – branded orange awlet
Bibasis oedipodea oedipodea (Swainson, 1820)
Bibasis oedipodea belesis (Mabille, 1876)
Bibasis tuckeri (Elwes & Edwards, 1897)
Bibasis etelka etelka (Hewitson, [1867]) = Burara
Bibasis harisa (Moore, [1866])
Bibasis harisa harisa (Moore, [1866])
Bibasis harisa consobrina (Plotz, 1884)
Bibasis vasutana (Moore, [1866])
Bibasis miraculata Evans, 1949 = Burara
Bibasis amara (Moore, [1866])
Bibasis gomata (Moore, [1866])
Bibasis gomata gomata (Moore, [1866])
Bibasis gomata lalita (Fruhstorfer, 1911)
Bibasis mahintha (Moore, [1875]) subspecies of Bibasis iluska (Hewitson, 1867)
Bibasis sena (Moore, [1866])
Bibasis sena sena (Moore, [1866])
Bibasis sena uniformis Elwes & Edwards, 1897

genus: Choaspes
Choaspes benjaminii – awl king
Choaspes benjaminii japonicus (Murray, 1875)
Choaspes xanthopogon xanthopogon (Kollar, [1844])
Choaspes stigmatus Evans, 1932 subspecies of Choaspes plateni
Choaspes stigmatus stigmatus Evans, 1932
Choaspes stigmatus caudatus Evans, 1932
Choaspes subcaudata crawfurdi (Distant, 1882)
Choaspes hemixanthus furcatus Evans, 1932 may be full species
genus: Hasora
Hasora anura de Niceville, 1889 – slate awl
Hasora anura anura de Niceville, 1889
Hasora anura danda Evans, 1949
Hasora badra badra (Moore, 1858) – common awl
Hasora chromus chromus (Cramer, 1782) – banded awl
Hasora taminatus bhavara Fruhstorfer, 1911 – white-banded awl
Hasora lizetta (Plotz, 1884)
Hasora salanga (Plotz, 1885)
Hasora proxissima Elwes & Edwards, 1897
Hasora proxissima siamica Evans, 1932
Hasora proxissima siva Evans, 1932
Hasora myra funebris Evans, 1932
Hasora zoma Evans, 1934
Hasora malayana malayana (Felder, 1860)
Hasora schoenherr (Latreille, [1824])
Hasora schoenherr chuza (Hewitson, [1867])
Hasora schoenherr gaspa Evans, 1949
Hasora mixta prabha Fruhstorfer, 1911
Hasora vitta (Butler, 1870)
Hasora vitta vitta (Butler, 1870)
Hasora vitta indica Evans, 1932
Hasora khoda coulteri Wood-Mason & de Niceville, [1887]
Hasora mavis Evans, 1934
Hasora leucospila leucospila (Mabille, 1891)

subfamily: Heteropterinae
genus: Apostictopterus
Apostictopterus fuliginosus curiosa (Swinhoe, 1917)
Astictopterus jama Felder & Felder, 1860
Astictopterus jama jama Felder & Felder, 1860
Astictopterus jama olivascens Moore, 1878

subfamily: Hesperiinae

genus: Arnetta
Arnetta atkinsoni (Moore, 1878)
Arnetta verones (Hewitson, 1878)

genus: Ochus
Ochus subvittatus subvittatus (Moore, 1878)

genus: Ampittia
Ampittia dioscorides (Fabricis, 1793)
Ampittia dioscorides camertes (Hewitson, [1868])
Ampittia dioscorides etura (Mabille, 1891)
Ampittia maroides de Niceville, 1896

genus: Aeromachus
Aeromachus kali (de Niceville, 1885)
Aeromachus stigmata shanda Evans, 1949
Aeromachus jhora creta Evans, 1949
Aeromachus dubius impha Evans, 1949
Aeromachus cognatus Inoue & Kawazoe, 1966
Aeromachus pygmaeus (Fabricius, 1775)

genus: Sebastonyma
Sebastonyma dolopia (Hewitson, [1868])
Sebastonyma pudens Evans, 1937
Sebastonyma suthepiana Murayama & Kimura, 1990

genus: Parasovia
Parasovia perbella (Hering, 1918)

genus: Sovia
Sovia albipectus (de Niceville, 1891)
Sovia ueharai Miyazaki & Saito, 2010
Sovia eminens Devyatkin, 1996

genus: Pedesta = Thoressa
Pedesta masuriensis tali (Swinhoe, 1912)
Pedesta pandita (de Niceville, 1885)
Pedesta serena (Evans, 1937)

genus: Onryza
Onryza meiktila (de Niceville, 1891)
Onryza siamica Riley & Godfrey, 1925

genus: Thoressa
Thoressa masoni (Moore, [1879])
Thoressa hyrie (de Niceville, 1891)
Thoressa cerata (Hewitson, 1876)
Thoressa submacula (Leech, 1890)
Thoressa submacula (Leech, 1890)
Thoressa submacula rubella Devyatkin, 1996
Thoressa fusca fusca (Elwes, [1893])
Thoressa monastyrskyi Devyatkin, 1996
Thoressa monastyrskyi monastyrskyi Devyatkin, 1996
Thoressa monastyrskiyi annamita Devyatkin & Monastyrskii, 1999

genus: Halpe
Halpe zema zema (Hewitson, 1877)
Halpe ormenes vilasina Fruhstorfer, 1911
Halpe zola zola Evans, 1937
Halpe elana Eliot, 1959
Halpe insignis (Distant, 1886)
Halpe sikkima Moore, 1882
Halpe porus (Mabille, [1877])
Halpe hauxwelli Evans, 1937
Halpe burmana Swinhoe, 1913
Halpe handa Evans, 1949
Halpe nephele Leech, 1893
Halpe arcuata Evans, 1937
Halpe flava Evans, 1926
Halpe aurifera (Elwes & Edwards, 1897)
Halpe toxopea Evans, 1932
Halpe kusala Fruhstorfer, 1911
Halpe pelethronix pelethronix Fruhstorfer, 1910
Halpe wantona Swinhoe, 1893
Halpe veluvana brevicornis Evans, 1932
Halpe frontieri Devyatkin, 1997
Halpe gamma Evans, 1937

genus: Pithauria
Pithauria stramineipennis Wood-Mason & de Niceville, [1887]
Pithauria murdava (Moore, [1866])
Pithauria marsena (Hewitson, [1866])

genus: Isoteinon
Isoteinon lamprospilus formosanus Fruhstorfer, 1910

genus: Iambrix
Iambrix salsala salsala (Moore, [1866])
Iambrix stellifer (Butler, [1879])

genus: Idmon
Idmon distanti Shepard, 1937
Idmon obliquans obliquans (Mabille, 1893)

genus: Koruthaialos
Koruthaialos rubecula (Plotz, 1882)
Koruthaialos rubecula rubecula (Plotz, 1882)
Koruthaialos rubecula hector Watson, 1893
Koruthaialos butleri de Niceville, [1884]
Koruthaialos sindu sindu (Felder & Felder, 1860)

genus: Psolos
Psolos fuligo (Mabille, 1876)
Psolos fuligo fuligo (Mabille, 1876)
Psolos fuligo subfasciatus (Moore, [1879])

genus: Stimula
Stimula swinhoei swinhoei (Elwes & Edwards, 1897)

genus: Ancistroides
Ancistroides nigrita (Latreille, [1824])
Ancistroides nigrita diocles (Moore, [1866])
Ancistroides nigrita othonias (Hewitson, 1878)
Ancistroides armatus armatus (H.Druce, 1873)
Ancistroides gemmifer gemmifer (Butler, [1879])

genus: Notocrypta
Notocrypta pria (H.Druce, 1873)
Notocrypta paralysos (Wood-Mason & de Niceville, 1881)
Notocrypta paralysos varians (Plotz, 1882)
Notocrypta paralysos asawa Fruhstorfer, 1911
Notocrypta clavata (Staudinger, 1889)
Notocrypta clavata clavata (Staudinger, 1889)
Notocrypta clavata theba Evans, 1949
Notocrypta curvifascia (Felder & Felder, 1862)
Notocrypta curvifascia curvifascia (Felder & Felder, 1862)
Notocrypta curvifascia corinda Evans, 1949
Notocrypta feisthamelii alysos (Moore, [1866])

genus: Udaspes
Udaspes folus (Cramer, [1775])

genus: Scobura
Scobura woolletti woolletti (Riley, 1923)
Scobura phiditia (Hewitson, [1866])
Scobura cephala (Hewitson, 1876)
Scobura isota (Swinhoe, 1893)
Scobura cephaloides kinka Evans, 1949
Scobura coniata Hering, 1918

genus: Suada
Suada swerga suava Evans, 1949
Suada albolineata Devyatkin, 2000

genus: Suastus
Suastus gremius gremius (Fabricius, 1798)
Suastus minutus aditia Evans, 1943
Suastus everyx everyx (Mabille, 1883)

genus: Cupitha
Cupitha purreea (Moore, 1877)

genus: Zographetus
Zographetus satwa (de Niceville, [1884])
Zographetus ogygia (Hewitson, [1866])
Zographeyus doxus Eliot, 1959
Zographetus ogygioides Elwes & Edwards, 1897
Zographetus rama (Mabille, [1877])
Zographeyus kutu Eliot, 1959

genus: Oerane
Oerane microthyrus neaera (de Niceville, 1891)

genus: Hyarotis
Hyarotis adrastus praba (Moore, 1865)
Hyarotis stubbsi Eliot, 1959
Hyarotis microsticta microsticta (Wood-Mason & Niceville, [1887])
Hyarotis iadera (de Niceville, 1895)

genus: Quedara
Quedara albifascia (Moore, [1879])
Quedara monteithi monteithi (Wood-Mason & de Niceville, [1887])
Quadara flavens Devyatkin, 2000

genus: Isma
Isma iapis iapis (de Niceville, 1890)
Isma protoclea (Herich-Schaffer, 1869)
 Isma protoclea obscura Distant, 1886
Isma protoclea bicolor Evans, 1926
Isma feralia lenya (Evans, 1932)
Isma dawna (Evans, 1926)
Isma umbrosa (Elwes & Edwards, 1897)
Isma umbrosa umbrosa (Elwes & Edwards, 1897)
Isma umbrosa minuscla Inoue & Kawazoe, 1967
Isma miosticta (de Niceville, 1891)
Isma damocles (Evans, [1939])
Isma guttulifera kuala (Evans, 1932)
Isma bononoides (H.H.Druce, 1912)
Isma bononia bononia (Hewitson, 1868)

genus: Pyroneura
Pyroneura helena (Butler, 1870)
Pyroneura natuna (Fruhstorfer, 1909)
Pyroneura flavia fruhstorferi (Mabille, 1893)
Pyroneura latoia latoia (Hewitson, [1868])
Pyroneura klanga (Evans, 1941)
Pyroneura derna (Evans, 1941)
Pyroneura niasana burmana (Evans, 1926)
Pyroneura callineura ssp.
Pyroneura agnesia agnesia (Eliot, 1967)
Pyroneura perakana perakana (Evans, 1926)
Pyroneura margherita miriam (Evans, 1941)
Pyroneura aurantiaca montivaga (Pendlebury, 1939)

genus: Plastingia
Plastingia naga (de Niceville, [1884])
Plastingia pellonia Fruhstorfer, 1909

genus: Salanoemia
Salanoemia tavoyana (Evans, 1926)
Salanoemia sala (Hewitson, [1866])
Salanoemia fuscicornis (Elwes & Edwards, 1897)

genus: Xanthoneura
Xanthoneura corissa indrasana (Elwes & de Niceville, [1887])

genus: Pemara
Pemara pugnans (de Niceville, 1891)

genus: Pseudokerana
Pseudokerana fulgur (de Niceville, 1894)

genus: Lotongus
Lotongus calathus (Hewitson, 1876)
Lotongus calathus calathus (Hewitson, 1876)
Lotongus calathus balta Evans, 1949
Lotongus saralachinensis Evans, 1932
Lotongus avesta (Hewitson, [1868])

genus: Zela
Zela excellens (Staudinger, 1889)
Zela onara solex (Evans, 1939)
Zela zeus optima (Fruhstorfer, 1911)
Zela zero Evans, 1932
Zela elioti Evans, [1939]
Zela smaragdinus (H.H.Druce, 1912)

genus: Gangara
Gangara thyrsis thyrsis (Fabricius, 1775)
Gangara sanguinocculus (Martin, 1895)
Gangara lebadea lebadea (Hewitson, [1868])

genus: Erionota
Erionota torus torus Evans, 1941
Erionota thrax thrax (Linnaeus, 1767)
Erionota acroleucus apicalis Evans, 1932
Erionota grandis grandis (Leech, 1890)
Erionota sybirita (Hewitson, 1876)

genus: Ge
Ge geta de Niceville, 1895

genus: Matapa
Matapa aria (Moore, [1866])
Matapa druna (Moore, [1866])
Matapa sasivarna (Moore, [1866])
Matapa cresta Evans, 1949
Matapa purpurascens Elwes & Edwards, 1897
Matapa deprivata de Jong, 1983

genus: Unkana
Unkana ambasa (Moore, [1858])
 Unkana ambasa attina (Hewitson, [1866])
Unkana ambasa batara Distant, 1886
Unkana flava Evans, 1932
Unkana mytheca mytheca (Hewitson, 1877)

genus: Hidari
Hidari irava (Moore, [1858])
Hidari doesoena doesonea Martin, 1895
Hidari bhawani de Nicéville, [1889]

genus: Eetion
Eetion elia (Hewitson, [1866])

genus: Acerbas
Acerbas anthea (Hewitson, [1868])
Acerbas anthea anthea (Hewitson, [1868])
Acerbas anthea pista Evans, 1949
Acerbas martini (Distant & Pryer, 1887)

genus: Pirdana
Pirdana hyela
Pirdana hyela rudolphii Elwes & de Niceville, [1887]
Pirdana hyela major Evans, 1932
Pirdana distanti Staudinger, 1889
Pirdana distanti distanti Staudinger, 1889
Pirdana distanti spenda Evans, 1949

genus: Creteus
Creteus cyrina cyrina (Hewitson, 1876)

genus: Ochlodes
Ochlodes subhyalina subhyalina (Bremer & Grey, 1853)
Ochlodes siva karennia Evans, 1932
Ochlodes brahma (Moore, 1878)
Ochlodes buddha ssp.

genus: Taractrocera
Taractrocera maevius sagara (Moore, [1866])
Taractrocera ziclea zenia Evans, 1934
Taractrocera archias (Felder, 1860)
Taractrocera archias samadha Fruhstorfer, 1910
Taractrocera archias quinta Swinhoe, 1913

genus: Oriens
Oriens paragola (de Niceville, [1896])
Oriens goloides (Moore, [1881])
Oriens gola pseudolus (Mabille, 1883)

genus: Potanthus
Potanthus rectifasciata (Elwes & Edwards, 1897)
Potanthus pamela Evans, 1934
Potanthus pallida (Evans, 1932)
Potanthus trachala tytleri (Evans, 1914)
Potanthus pseudomaesa clio (Evans, 1932)
Potantus juno juno (Evans, 1932)
Potanthus sita (Evans, 1932)
Potanthus omaha omaha (W.H.Edwards, 1863)
Potanthus flava alcon (Evans, 1932)
Potanthus confucius dushta (Fruhstorfer, 1911)
Potanthus nesta nesta (Evans, 1934)
Potanthus mingo ajax (Evans, 1932)
Potanthus pava pava (Fruhstorfer, 1911)
Potanthus lydia (Evans, 1934)
Potanthus lydia lydia (Evans, 1934)
Potanthus lydia fraseri (Evans, 1934)
Potanthus ganda ganda (Fruhstorfer, 1911)
Potanthus chloe Eliot, 1960
Potanthus palnia palnia (Evans, 1914)
Potanthus hetaerus serina (Plotz, 1883)
Potanthus parvus Johnson & Johnson, 1980

genus: Telicota
Telicota colon stinga Evans, 1949
Telicota augias augias (Linnaeus, 1767)
Telicota linna linna Evans, 1949
Telicota besta besta Evans, 1949
Telicota bambusae (Moore, 1878)
Telicota bambusae bambusae (Moore, 1878)
Telicota bambusae horisha Evans, 1934
Telicota ohara jix Evans, 1949
Telicota hilda hilda Eliot, 1959

genus: Cephrenes
Cephrenes acalle (Hopffer, 1874)
Cephrenes acalle niasicus (Plotz, 1886)
Cephrenes acalle oceanicus (Mabille, 1904)

genus: Parnara
Parnara guttatus mangala (Moore, [1866])
Parnara naso bada (Moore, 1878)
Parnara ganga Evans, 1937
Parnara apostata hulsei Devyatkin & Monastyrskii, 1999

genus: Borbo
Borbo cinnara (Wallace, 1866)

genus: Pseudoborbo
Pseudoborbo bevani (Moore, 1878)

genus: Pelopidas
Pelopidas sinensis Mabille, 1877
Pelopidas agna agna (Moore, [1866])
Pelopidas subochracea barneyi (Evans, 1937)
Pelopidas flavus (Evans, 1926)
Pelopidas mathias mathias (Fabricius, 1798)
Pelopidas assamensis (de Niceville, 1882)
Pelopidas conjunctus conjunctus (Herrich-Schaffer, 1869)

genus: Polytremis
Polytremis lubricans lubricans (Herrich-Schaffer, 1869)
Polytremis minuta (Evans, 1926)
Polytremis annama Evans, 1937
Polytremis discreta discreta (Elwes & Edwards, 1897)
Polytremis eltola eltola (Hewitson, [1869])

genus: Baoris
Baoris farri farri (Moore, 1878)
Baoris oceia (Hewitson, [1868])
Baoris penicillata
Baoris penicillata unicolor Moore, [1884]
Baoris penicillata chapmani Evans, 1937
Baoris pagana (de Niceville, 1887)

genus: Caltoris
Caltoris brunnea caere (de Niceville, 1891)
Caltoris sirius sirius (Evans, 1926)
Caltoris cahira austeni (Moore, [1884])
Caltoris tenuis (Evans, 1932)
Caltoris bromus bromus Leech, 1893
Caltoris confusa (Evans, 1932)
Caltoris cormasa (Hewitson, 1876)
Caltoris kumara moorei (Evans, 1926)
Caltoris malaya (Evans, 1926)
Caltoris tulsi tulsi (de Niceville, [1884])
Caltoris plebeia (de Niceville, 1887)
Caltoris philippina philippina (Herrich-Schaffer, 1869)

genus: Iton
Iton semamora semamora (Moore, [1866])
Iton watsonii (de Niceville, 1890)

subfamily: Pyrginae

genus: Abraximorpha
Abraximorpha davidii (Mabille, 1876) – magpie flat
Abraximorpha davidii davidii (Mabille, 1876)
Abraximorpha davidii esta Evans, 1949
Abraximorpha davidii elfina Evans, 1949

genus: Capila
Capila lidderdali (Elwes, 1888)
Capila lineata Chou & Gu, 1994
Capila lineata magna Devyatkin & Monastyrskii, 1999
Capila lineata irregularis Devyatkin & Monastyrskii, 2002
Capila pauripunetata tamdaoensis Devyatkin, 1996
Capila phanaeus (Hewitson, 1867)
Capila phanaeus lalita (Doherty, [1886])
Capila phanaeus fulva Evans, 1932
Capila phanaeus flora Evans, 1934
Capila phanaeus ferrea Evans, 1934
Capila phanaeus falta Evans, 1949
Capila phanaeus decoloris Inoue & Kawazoe, 1964
Capila pennicillatum insularis (Joicey & Talbot, 1921)
Capila pieridoides (Moore, 1878)
Capila pieridoides pieridoides (Moore, 1878)
Capila pieridoides sofa Evans, 1934
Capila translucida Leech, 1894
Capila jayadeva (Moore, 1866)
Capila zennara sukkiti Ek-Amnuay, 2006
Capila hainana Crowley, 1900
Capila hainana hainana Crowley, 1900
Capila hainana arooni Eliot, 1987

genus: Lobocla
Lobocla liliana (Atkinson, 1871)
Lobocla liliana liliana (Atkinson, 1871)
Lobocla liliana tonka Evans, 1949

genus: Celaenorrhinus
Celaenorrhinus aspersa
Celaenorrhinus aspersa aspersa Leech, 1891
Celaenorrhinus aspersa pinratanai Eliot, 1984
Celaenorrhinus inexpectus Devyatkin, 2000
Celaenorrhinus incestus Devyatkin, 2000
Celaenorrhinus phuongi Devyatkin, 2001
Celaenorrhinus oscula Evans, 1949
Celaenorrhinus kuznetsovi Devyatkin, 2000
Celaenorrhinus pyrrha de Niceville, 1889
Celaenorrhinus ratna tytleri Evans, 1926
Celaenorrhinus pero luciferaLeech, 1893
Celaenorrhinus sumitra (Moore, [1866])
Celaenorrhinus patula de Niceville, 1889
Celaenorrhinus victor Devyatkin, 2003
Celaenorrhinus leucocera (Kollar, [1844])
Celaenorrhinus putra sanda Evans, 1941
Celaenorrhinus munda maculicornis Elews & Edwards, 1897
Celaenorrhinus nigricans nigricans (de Niceville, 1885)
Celaenorrhinus asmara (Butler, 1879)
Celaenorrhinus asmara asmara (Butler, 1879)
Celaenorrhinus asmara consertus de Niceville, 1890
Celaenorrhinus dhanada Moore, 1865
Celaenorrhinus dhanada dhanada Moore, 1865
Celaenorrhinus dhanada affinis Elwes & Edward, 1897
Celaenorrhinus andamanicus hannaEvans, 1949
Celaenorrhinus inaequalis irene Evans, 1941
Celaenorrhinus aurivittatus (Moore, [1879])
Celaenorrhinus cameroni (Distant, 1882)
Celaenorrhinus vietnamicus Devyatkin, 1997
Celaenorrhinus ladana (Butler, 1870)
Celaenorrhinus ficulnea queda (Plotz, 1885)

genus: Tapena
Tapena thwaitesi Moore, [1881]
Tapena thwaitesi minuscula Elwes & Edwards, 1897
Tapena thwaitesi bornea Evans, 1931

genus: Darpa
Darpa hanria Moore, [1866]
Darpa striata (H.Druce, 1873)
Darpa striata striata (H.Druce, 1873)
Darpa striata mintaEvans, 1949
Darpa inopinata Devyatkin, 2001
Darpa pteria dealbata (Distant, 1886)

genus: Odina
Odina decoratus (Hewitson, 1867)
Odina hieroglyphica ortygia de Niceville, [1896]

genus: Pseudocoladenia
Pseudocoladenia dan (Fabricius, 1787)
Pseudocoladenia dan dhyan (Fruhstorfer, 1909)
Pseudocoladenia dan fabia (Evans, 1949)
Pseudocoladenia festa (Evans, 1949)

genus: Coladenia
Coladenia indrani uposathra Fruhstorfer, 1911
Coladenia agni (de Niceville, [1884])
Coladenia agni agni (de Niceville, [1884])
Coladenia agni sundae de Jong, 1992
Coladenia tanya Devyatkin, 2002
Coladenia agnioides Elwes & Edwards, 1897
Coladenia buchananii (de Niceville, 1889)
Coladenia laxmi (de Niceville, [1889])
Coladenia laxmi laxmi (de Niceville, [1889])
Coladenia laxmi sobrina Elwes & Edwards, 1897
Coladenia hoenei Evans, 1939
Coladenia koiwayai Maruyama & Uehara, 2008

genus: Sarangesa
Sarangesa dasahara dasahara (Moore, [1866])

genus: Satarupa
Satarupa zulla ourvardi Oberthur, 1921

genus: Seseria
Seseria sambara (Moore, [1866])
Seseria sambara sambara (Moore, [1866])
Seseria sambara indosinica (Fruhstorfer, 1909)
Seseria dohertyi salex Evans, 1949
Seseria strigata Evans, 1926
Seseria affinis kirmana (Plotz, 1885)

genus: Pintara
Pintara capiloides Devyatkin, 1998
Pintara bowringi colorata Devyatkin, 1998
Pintara tabrica (Hewitson, [1873])
Pintara pinwilli pinwilli (Butler, [1879])
Pintara prasobsuki (Ek-Amnuay, 2006)
Pintara prasobsuki prasobsuki (Ek-Amnuay, 2006)
Pintara prasobsuki lao Maruyama & Uehara, 2008

genus: Chamunda
Chamunda chamunda (Moore, [1866])

genus: Gerosis
Gerosis sinica (Felder & Felder, 1862)
Gerosis sinica narada (Moore, 1884)
Gerosis sinica minima (Swinhoe, 1912)
Gerosis phisara phisara (Moore, 1884)
Gerosis bhagava bhagava (Moore, [1866])
Gerosis limax dirae (de Niceville, 1895)
Gerosis tristis (Eliot, 1959)
Gerosis tristis tristis (Eliot, 1959)
Gerosis tristis gaudialis Devyatkin, 2001

genus: Tagiades
Tagiades japetus (Stoll, [1781])
Tagiades japetus atticus (Fabricius, 1793)
Tagiades japetus ravi (Moore, [1866])
Tagiades gana (Moore, [1866])
Tagiades gana gana (Moore, [1866])
Tagiades gana meetana Moore, [1879]
Tagiades gana sangarava Fruhstorfer, 1910
Tagiades parra Fruhstorfer, 1910
Tagiades parra gala Evans, 1949
Tagiades parra naxos Evans, 1949
Tagiades hybridus Devyatkin, 2001
Tagiades lavatus Butler, [1879]
Tagiades calligana Butler, [1879]
Tagiades toba toba de Niceville, [1896]
Tagiades vajuna vajuna Fruhstorfer, 1910
Tagiades ultra Evans, 1932
Tagiades menaka menaka (Moore, [1866])
Tagiades cohaerens cynthia Evans, 1934

genus: Mooreana
Mooreana trichoneura (Felder & Feler, 1860)
Mooreana trichoneura trichoneura (Felder & Feler, 1860)
Mooreana trichoneura pralaya (Moore, [1866])

genus: Ctenoptilum
Ctenoptilum vasava vasava (Moore, [1866])
Ctenoptilum multiguttatum de Niceville, 1890

genus: Odontoptilum
Odontoptilum angulata angulata (C.Felder, 1862)
Odontoptilum pygela pygela (Hewitson, [1868])

genus: Caprona
Caprona agama agama (Moore, [1858])
Caprona alida alida (de Niceville, 1891)

Family Papilionidae 

subfamily: Parnassiinae

genus: Bhutanitis
Bhutanitis lidderdalei ocellatomaculata

subfamily: Papilioninae

tribe: Leptocircini

genus: Meandrusa
Meandrusa lachinus (Fruhstorfer, [1902])
Meandrusa lachinus aribbas (Fruhstorfer, 1909)
Meandrusa lachinus nagamasai Okano, 1986
Meandrusa lachinus sukkiti Nakano, 1995
Meandrusa lachinus helenusoides Funahashi, 2003
Meandrusa payeni Boisduval, 1836
Meandrusa payeni langsonensis (Fruhstorfer, 1901)
Meandrusa payeni ciminius (Fruhstrofer, 1909)
Meandrusa sciron hajiangensis Funahashi, 2003

genus: Teinopalpus
Teinopalpus imperialis imperatrix de Niceville, 1899
Teinopalpus aureus Mell, 1923
Teinopalpus aureus eminens Turlin, 1991
Teinopalpus aureus shinkaii Morita, 1998
Teinopalpus aureus laotiana Collard, 2007

genus: Graphium
Graphium empedovana empedovana (Corbet, 1941)
Graphium cloanthus cloanthus (Westwood, 1841)
Graphium sarpedon sarpedon (Linnaeus, 1758)
Graphium sarpedon islander Monastyrskii, 2012
Graphium sarpedon luctatius Fruhstorfer, 1907
Graphium doson (Felder & Felder, 1864)
Graphium doson axion (Felder & Felder, 1864)
Graphium doson evemonides (Honrath, 1884)
Graphium doson kajanga (Corbet, 1937)
Graphium doson robinson Monastyrskii, 2012
Graphium evemon (Boisduval, 1836)
Graphium evemon albociliatis (Fruhstorfer, 1901)
Graphium evemon eventus (Fruhstorfer, 1907)
Graphium eurypylus (Linnaeus, 1758)
Graphium eurypylus mecisteus (Distant, 1885)
Graphium eurypylus acheron (Moore, 1885)
Graphium bathycles bathycloides (Honrath, 1884)
Graphium chironides chironides (Honrath, 1884)
Graphium chironides malayanum Eliot, 1982
Graphium leechi (Rothschild, 1895)
Graphium agamemnon agamemnon (Linnaeus, 1758)
Graphium arycles (Boisduval, 1836)
Graphium arycles arycles (Boisduval, 1836)
Graphium arycles sphinx (Fruhstorfer, 1899)
Graphium agetes agetes (Westwood, 1843)
Graphium agetes iponus (Fruhstorfer, 1902)
Graphium nomius swinhoei (Moore, 1878)
Graphium aristeus hermocrates (Felder & Felder, 1865)
Graphium antiphates pompilius (Fabricius, 1787)
Graphium antiphates itamputi (Butler, 1885)
Graphium antiphates pulauensis (Eliot, 1983)
Graphium phidias (Oberthur, 1906)
Graphium macareus (Godart, 1819)
Graphium macareus perakensis (Fruhstorfer, 1899)
Graphium macareus indochinensis (Fruhstorfer, 1901)
Graphium macareus burmensis Moonen, 1984
Graphium macareus macaristus (Grose-Smith, 1887)
Graphium xenocles (Doubleday, 1842)
Graphium xenocles kephisos (Fruhstorfer, 1902)
Graphium xenocles lindos (Fruhstorfer, 1902)
Graphium megarus megapenthes (Fruhstorfer, 1902)
Graphium megarus tiomanensis (Eliot, 1978)
Graphium ramaceus pendleburyi (Corbet, 1941)
Graphium delesserti delesserti (Guerin-Meneville, 1839)
Graphium eurous (Leech, 1893)
Graphium eurous inthanon Katayama, 1986
Graphium mandarinus (Oberthur, 1879)
Graphium mandarinus mandarinus (Oberthur, 1879)
Graphium mandarinus kimurai Murayama, 1982
Graphium mandarinus fangana (Okano, 1986)
Graphium mullah kooichii (Morita, 1996)

genus: Lamproptera
Lamproptera curius (Fabricius, 1787)
Lamproptera curius curius (Fabricius, 1787)
Lamproptera curius walkeri (Moore, 1902)
Lamproptera meges (Zinken, 1831)
Lamproptera meges virescens (Butler, [1870])
Lamproptera meges annamiticus (Fruhstorfer, 1909)

tribe: Papilionini

genus: Papilio
Papilio agestor agestor Gray, 1831
Papilio agestor shirozui (Igarashi, 1979)
Papilio epycides Hewitson, [1864]
Papilio epycides hypochra Jordan, 1909
Papilio epycides curiatius Fruhstorfer, 1902
Papilio epycides imitata (Monastyrskii & Devyatkin, 2003)
Papilio slateri Hewitson, [1859]
Papilio slateri slateri Hewitson, [1859]
Papilio slateri perses de Niceville, 1894
Papilio slateri tavoyanus Butler, 1882
Papilio slateri marginata Oberthür, 1893
Papilio clytia clytia Linnaeus, 1758
Papilio paradoxa (Zinken, 1831)
Papilio paradoxa telearchus Hewitson, 1852
Papilio paradoxa aenigma Wallace, 1865
Papilio elwesi Leech, 1889
Papilio demoleus Linnaeus, 1758
Papilio demoleus demoleus Linnaeus, 1758
Papilio demoleus malayanus Wallace, 1865
Papilio machaon verityi Fruhstorfer, 1907
Papilio machaon birmanicus Rothschild, 1908
Papilio xuthus Linnaeus, 1767
Papilio demolion demolion Cramer, [1776]
Papilio noblei de Niceville, [1889]
Papilio noblei haynei Tytler, 1926
Papilio castor Westwood, 1842
Papilio castor mahadeva Moore, [1879]
Papilio castor mehala Grose-Smith, 1886
Papilio castor dioscurus Jordan, 1909
Papilio castor khmer Boullet & Le Cerf, 1912
Papilio nephelus Boisduval, 1836
Papilio nephelus ducenarius Fruhstorfer, 1908
Papilio nephelus chaon Westwood, 1845
Papilio nephelus annulus Pendlebury, 1936
Papilio nephelus sunatus Corbet, 1940
Papilio helenus helenus Linnaeus, 1758
Papilio iswara iswara White, 1842
Papilio iswaroides curtisi Jordan, 1909
Papilio polytes Linnaeus, 1758
Papilio polytes polytes Linnaeus, 1758
Papilio polytes romulus Cramer, [1775]
Papilio memnon agenor Linnaeus, 1758
Papilio bootes xamunuensis Tateishi, 2001
Papilio bootes bootes Westwood, 1842
Papilio alcmenor alcmenor Felder & Felder, 1865
Papilio protenor euprotenor Fruhstorfer, 1908
Papilio prexaspes Felder & Felder, [1865]
Papilio prexaspes prexaspes Felder & Felder, 1865
Papilio prexaspes andamanicus Rothschild, 1908
Papilio prexaspes pitmani Elwes & de Niceville, [1887]
Papilio prexaspes duboisi Vitalis, 1914
Papilio dialis doddsi Janet, 1896
Papilio dialis schanus Jordan, 1909
Papilio bianor Cramer, [1777]
Papilio bianor gladiator Fruhstorfer, [1902]
Papilio bianor stockleyi Gabriel, 1936
Papilio bianor pinratanai Racheli & Cotton, 1983
Papilio paris paris Linnaeus, 1758
Papilio arcturus arcturus Westwood, 1842
Papilio krishna charlesi Fruhstorfer, 1902
Papilio krishna thawgawa Tytler, 1939
Papilio palinurus palinurus Fabricius, 1787
Papilio polyctor significans Fruhstorfer, 1902

tribe: Troidini

genus: Atrophaneura
Atrophaneura varuna (White, 1842)
Atrophaneura varuna varuna (White, 1842)
Atrophaneura varuna astorion (Westwood, 1842)
Atrophaneura varuna zaleucus (Hewitson, [1865])
Atrophaneura nox erebus (Wallace, 1865)
Atrophaneura aidoneus (Doubleday, 1845)
Atrophaneura sycorax egertoni (Distant, 1886)
Atrophaneura nevilli (Wood-Mason, 1882)
Atrophaneura crassipes (Oberthür, 1893)
Atrophaneura alcinous mansonensis (Fruhstorfer, 1901)

genus: Losaria
Losaria coon doubledayi (Wallace, 1865)
Losaria neptunus (Guerin-Meneville, [1840])
Losaria neptunus neptunus (Guerin-Meneville, 1840)
Losaria neptunus manasukkiti Cotton, Racheli & Sukhumalind, 2005

genus: Byasa
Byasa laos (Riley & Godfrey, 1921)
Byasa adamsoni (Grose-Smith, 1886)
Byasa adamsoni adamsoni (Grose-Smith, 1886)
Byasa adamsoni takakoae Uehara, 2006
Byasa crassipes (Oberthür, 1879)
Byasa dasarada (Moore, 1857)
Byasa hedistus (Jordan, 1928)
Byasa latreillei (Donovan, 1826)
Byasa polyeuctes (Doubleday, 1842)

genus: Trogonoptera
Trogonoptera brookiana albescens (Rothschild, 1895)
Trogonoptera brookiana trogon (Vollenhoven, 1860)

genus: Troides
Troides helena cerberus (Felder & Felder, 1865)
Troides aeacus (Felder & Felder, 1860)
Troides aeacus aeacus (Felder & Felder, 1860)
Troides aeacus malaiianus Fruhstorfer, 1902
Troides amphrysus ruficollis (Butler, [1879])
Troides cuneifera paeninsulae (Pendlebury, 1936)

genus: Pachliopta
Pachliopta aristolochiae (Fabricius, 1775)
Pachliopta aristolochiae asteris (Rothschild, 1908)
Pachliopta aristolochiae goniopeltis (Rothschild, 1908)

Family Pieridae 

subfamily: Coliadinae

genus: Catopsilia
Catopsilia scylla cornelia (Fabricius, 1787)
Catopsilia pyranthe pyranthe (Linnaeus, 1758)
Catopsilia pomona pomona (Fabricius, 1775)

genus: Dercas
Dercas verhuelli (van der Hoeven, 1839)
 Dercas verhuelli doubledayi [Moore, 1905]
 Dercas verhuelli parva Evans, 1924
Dercas gobrias herodorus Fruhstorfer, 1910
Dercas lycorias lycorias (Doubleday, 1842)

genus: Gonepteryx
Gonepteryx amintha ssp.

genus: Gandaca
Gandaca harina (Horsfield, [1829])
Gandaca harina burmana [Moore, 1906]
Gandaca harina distanti Fruhstorfer, 1910
Gandaca harina aora Moulton, 1923

genus: Eurema
Eurema brigitta (Stoll, [1780])
Eurema brigitta senna (Felde & Felder, [1865])
Eurema brigitta hainana (Moore, 1878)
Eurema laeta pseudolaeta (Moore, 1906)
Eurema lacteola lacteola (Distant, 1886)
Eurema hecabe hecabe (Linnaeus, 1758)
Eurema hecabe contubernalis (Moore, 1886)
Eurema blanda (Wallace, 1867)
 Eurema blanda blanda (Wallace, 1867)
 Eurema blanda silhetana (Wallace, 1867)
Eurema blanda snelleni (Moore, [1907])
Eurema simulatrix Staudinger, 1891
Eurema simulatrix tecmessa (de Niceville, [1896])
Eurema simulatrix sarinoides (Fruhstorfer, 1910)
Eurema simulatrix littorea Morishita, 1968
Eurema simulatrix tiomanica Okubo, 1983
Eurema sari sodalis (Moore, 1886)
Eurema andersoni (Moore, 1886)
Eurema andersoni andersoni (Moore, 1886)
Eurema andersoni sadanobui Shirozu & Yata, 1982
Eurema novapallida Yata, 1992
Eurema novapallida novapallida Yata, 1992
Eurema novapallida phukiwoana Yata & Kimura, 2011
Eurema nicevillei nicevillei (Butler, 1898)
Eurema ada Distant & Pryer, 1887
Eurema ada iona (Talbot, 1939)
Eurema ada indosinica Yata, 1991

genus: Colias
Colias fieldii fieldii Menetries, 1855

subfamily: Pierinae

genus: Leptosia
Leptosia nina
Leptosia nina nina (Fabricius, 1793)
Leptosia nina malayana Fruhstorfer, 1910

genus: Aporia
Aporia agathon (Gray, 1831)
Aporia agathon bifurcata Tytler, 1939
Aporia agathon sapaensis Funahashi, 2003
Aporia gigantea gigantea Koiwawya, 1993

genus: Delias
Delias agoranis Grose-Smith, 1887
Delias singhapura singhapura (Wallace, 1867)
Delias vietnamensis Monastyrskii & Devyatkin, 2000
Delias patrua shan Talbot, 1937
Delias lativitta parva Talbot, 1937
Delias baracasa dives de Nicéville, 1897
Delias sanaca perspicua Fruhstorfer, 1910
Delias berinda yedanula Fruhstorfer, 1910
Delias berinda berinda (Moore, 1872)
Delias berinda boyleae Butler, 1885
Delias belladonna (Fabricius, 1793)
Delias belladonna belladonna (Fabricius, 1793)
Delias belladonna hedybia Jordan, 1925
Delias belladonna endoi Yagishita, 1993
Delias belladonna yukaae Nakano, 1993
Delias belladonna malayana Pendlebury, 1933
Delias pasithoe (Linnaeus, 1767)
Delias pasithoe pasithoe (Linnaeus, 1767)
Delias pasithoe parthenope (Wallace, 1867)
Delias pasithoe beata Fruhstorfer, 1905
Delias pasithoe thyra Fruhstorfer, 1905
Delias acalis (Godart, 1819)
Delias acalis pyramus (Wallace, 1867)
Delias acalis perakana Talbot, 1928
Delias acalis shinkaii Morita, 1998
Delias ninus ninus (Wallace, 1867)
Delias descombesi (Boisduval, 1836)
Delias descombesi descombesi (Boisduval, 1836)
Delias descombesi eranthos Fruhstorfer, 1905
Delias agostina (Hewitson, 1852)
Delias agostina agostina (Hewitson, [1852])
Delias agostina annamitica Fruhstorfer, 1901
Delias agostina johnsoni Corbet, 1933
Delias hyparete Linnaeus, 1758
Delias hyparete indica (Wallace, 1867)
Delias hyparete metarete Butler, [1879]
Delias georgina tahanica Rothschild, 1925
Delias georgina orphne (Wallace, 1867)
Delias georgina zenobia Pendlebury, 1939
Delias georgina keda Talbot, [1937]

genus: Cepora
Cepora nerissa (Fabricius, 1775)
Cepora nerissa nerissa (Fabricius, 1775)
Cepora nerissa dapha (Moore, [1879])
Cepora nadina nadina (Lucas, 1852)
Cepora nadina andersoni (Distant, 1885)
Cepora iudith (Fabricius, 1787)
Cepora iudith lea (Doubleday, 1846)
Cepora iudith malaya (Fruhstorfer, 1899)
Cepora iudith siamensis (Butler, 1899)
Cepora iudith talboti Corbet, 1937

genus: Prioneris
Prioneris philonome (Boisduval, 1836)
Prioneris philonome clemanthe (Doubleday, 1846)
Prioneris philonome themana Fruhstorfer, 1903
Prioneris thestylis thestylis (Doubleday, 1842)
Prioneris thestylis malaccana Fruhstorfer, 1899

genus: Appias
Appias olferna olferna Swinhoe, 1890
Appias lyncida (Cramer, [1779])
Appias lyncida eleonora (Boisduval, 1836)
Appias lyncida vasava Fruhstorfer, 1910
Appias nero figulina (Butler, 1867)
Appias galba (Wallace, 1867)
Appias albina albina (Boisduval, 1836)
Appias albina darada (Felder & Felder, [1865])
Appias paulina (Cramer, [1777])
Appias paulina adamsoni (Moore, 1905)
Appias paulina distanti (Moore, 1905)
Appias paulina griseoides Moulton, 1923
Appias paulina grisea Moulton, 1923
Appias indra (Moore, [1858])
Appias indra indra (Moore, [1858])
Appias indra plana Butler, 1879
Appias indra thronion Fruhstorfer, 1910
Appias pandione lagela Moore, [1879]
Appias lalage lalage (Doubleday, 1842)
Appias cardena perakana (Fruhstorfer, 1902)
Appias lalassis Grose-Smith, 1887
Appias lalassis indroides (Honrath, [1890])

genus: Saletara
Saletara liberia distanti Butler, 1898

genus: Udaiana
Udaiana cynis cynis (Hewitson, [1866])

genus: Pieris
Pieris brassicae nepalensis Gray, 1846
Pieris melete montana Verity, 1908
Pieris naganum (Moore, 1884)
Pieris naganum pamsi Vitalis de Salvaza

genus: Artogeia
Artogeia rapae crucivora (Boisduval, 1836)
Artogeia canidia canidia (Sparrman, 1768)
Artogeia erutae montana (Verity, 1911)

genus: Talbotia
Talbotia naganum pamsi (Vitalis de Salvaza, 1921)

genus: Pontia
Pontia edusa moorei (Rober, [1907])

genus: Ixias
Ixias pyrene (Linnaeus, 1764)
Ixias pyrene verna H.Druce, 1874
Ixias pyrene yunnanensis Fruhstorfer, 1902
Ixias pyrene latifasciata Butler, 1871
Ixias pyrene birdi Distant, 1883
Ixias pyrene alticola Pendlebury, 1933

genus: Hebomoia
Hebomoia glaucippe glaucippe (Linnaeus, 1758)
Hebomoia glaucippe aturia Fruhstorfer, 1910
Hebomoia glaucippe anomala Pendlebury, 1939
Hebomoia glaucippe theia Nishimura, 1987

genus: Pareronia
Pareronia avatar (Moore, [1858])
Pareronia hippia (Fabricius, 1787)
Pareronia paravatar Bingham, 1907
Pareronia anais anais (Lesson, 1837)
Pareronia valeria lutescens (Butler, 1879)

genus: Phrissura
Phrissura aegis cynis (Hewitson, [1866])
Phrissura aegis pryeri (Distant, 1885)

Family Riodinidae 

genus: Abisara
Abisara abnormis Moore, [1884]
Abisara bifasciata Moore, 1877
Abisara bifasciata angulata Moore, [1879]
Abisara bifasciata angustilineata Inoue & Kawazoe, 1964
Abisara burnii (de Niceville, 1895)
Abisara burnii burnii (de Niceville, 1895)
Abisara burnii timaeus (Fruhstorfer, [1904])
Abisara echerius (Stoll, [1790])
Abisara echerius echerius (Stoll, [1790])
Abisara echerius paionea Fruhstorfer, [1914]
Abisara echerius notha Bennett, 1950
Abisara freda freda Bennett, 1957
Abisara fylla fylla (Westwood, [1851])
Abisara fylloides magdala Fruhstorfer, [1904]
Abisara geza niya Fruhstorfer, [1914]
Abisara kausambi kausambi Felder & Felder, 1860
Abisara miyazakii K. & T. Saito, 2005
Abisara miyazakii miyazakii K. & T.Saito, 2005
Abisara miyazakii shigehoi K. & T.Saito, 2005
Abisara neophron (Hewitson, [1861])
Abisara neophron chelina (Fruhstorfer, [1904])
Abisara neophron gratius Fruhstorfer, 1912
Abisara saturata (Moore, 1878)
Abisara saturata meta Fruhstorfer, [1904]
Abisara saturata maya Bennett, 1950
Abisara saturata kausambioides de Niceville, [1896]
Abisara savitri albisticta K. and T.Saito, 2005

genus: Dodona
Dodona adonira adonira Hewitson, [1866]
Dodona deodata Hewitson, 1876
Dodona deodata deodata Hewitson, 1876
Dodona deodata lecerfi Fruhstorfer, [1914]
Dodona dipoea dracon de Niceville, 1897
Dodona durga rubula Fruhstorfer, [1914]
Dodona egeon egeon (Westwood, [1851])
Dodona eugenes venox Fruhstorfer, 1912
Dodona eugenes chaseni Corbet, 1941 
Dodona katerina Monastyrskii & Devyatkin, 2000
Dodona katerina katerina Monastyrskii & Devyatkin, 2000
Dodona katerina sombra Monastyrskii & Devyatkin, 2003
Dodona maculosa phuongi Monastyrskii & Devyatkin, 2000
Dodona ouida ouida Hewitson, [1866]
Dodona speciosa Monastyrskii & Devyatkin, 2000

genus: Laxita
Laxita thuisto (Hewitson, [1861])
Laxita thuisto thuisto (Hewitson, [1861])
Laxita thuisto ephorus (Fruhstorfer, [1904])

genus: Paralaxita
Paralaxita damajanti damajanti (Felder and Felder, 1860)
Paralaxita orphna laocoon (de Niceville, 1894)
Paralaxita telesia (Hewitson, [1861])
Paralaxita telesia lyclene (de Niceville, 1894)
Paralaxita telesia boulleti (Fruhstorfer, [1914])
Paralaxita dora   (Fruhstorfer, 1904)

genus: Stiboges
Stiboges nymphidia Butler, 1876
Stiboges nymphidia nymphidia Butler, 1876
Stiboges nymphidia elodinia Fruhstorfer, [1914]

genus: Taxila
Taxila haquinus (Fabricius, 1793)
Taxila haquinus haquinus (Fabricius, 1793)
Taxila haquinus fasciata Moore, [1879]
Taxila haquinus berthae Fruhstorfer, [1904]

genus: Zemeros
Zemeros flegyas (Cramer, [1780])
Zemeros flegyas flegyas (Cramer, [1780])
Zemeros flegyas allica (Fabricius, 1787)
Zemeros flegyas albipunctatus Butler, 1874
Zemeros emesoides emesoides Felder & Felder, 1860

Family Lycaenidae

subfamily: Poritiinae

genus: Cyaniriodes
Cyaniriodes libna andersonii (Moore, 1884)

genus: Deramas
Deramas cham Saito & Seki, 2006
Deramas jasoda jasoda (de Niceville, [1889])
Deramas livens Distant, 1886
Deramas livens evansi Eliot, 1964
Deramas nelvis nelvis Eliot, 1964
Deramas nolens pasteuri Eliot, 1978

genus: Poritia
Poritia erycinoides (Felder &Felder, 1865)
Poritia erycinoides phraatica Hewitson, [1878]
Poritia erycinoides trishna Fruhstorfer, 1919
Poritia hewitsoni Moore, [1866]
Poritia hewitsoni tavoyana Doherty, 1889
Poritia hewitsoni regia Doherty, 1889
Poritia karennia Evans, 1921
Poritia manilia Fruhstorfer, [1912]
Poritia manilia dawna Evans, 1921
Poritia manilia evansi Corbet, 1940
Poritia philota philota Hewitson, 1874
Poritia plateni Staudinger, 1889
Poritia pleurata Hewitson, 1874
Poritia sumatrae sumatrae (Felder& Felder, 1865)

genus: Simiskina
Simiskina pasira (Moulton, [1912])
Simiskina pavonica veturia (Fruhstorfer, [1912])
Simiskina pediada (Hewitson, 1877)
Simiskina phalena (Hewitson, 1874)
Simiskina phalena phalena (Hewitson, 1874)
Simiskina phalena harterti (Doherty, 1889)
Simiskina phalia potina (Hewitson, 1874)
Simiskina pharyge deolina (Fruhstorfer, 1917)
Simiskina pheretia pheretia (Hewitson, 1874)
Simiskina proxima dohertyi Evans, 1925

subfamily: Curetinae

genus: Curetis
Curetis acuta dentata Moore, 1879
Curetis bulis bulis (Westwood, [1851])
Curetis bulis stigmata (Moore, 1879)
Curetis felderi Distant, 1884
Curetis freda Eliot, 1959
Curetis insularis (Horsfield, [1829])
Curetis naga Evans, 1954
Curetis regula Evans, 1954
Curetis santana malayica (Felder & Felder, 1865)
Curetis saronis indosinica Fruhstorfer, 1908
Curetis saronis gloriosa Moore, [1884]
Curetis saronis sumatrana Corbet, 1937
Curetis sperthis sperthis (Felder & Felder, 1865)
Curetis sperthis metayei Inoue & Kawazoe, 1965
Curetis sperthis kawazoei Okubo, 1983
Curetis tagalica (Felder & Felder, 1862)
Curetis tagalica jopa Fruhstorfer, 1908
Curetis tagalica vietnamica Inoue & Kawazoe, 1964
Curetis thetis (Drury, [1773])
Curetis tonkina Evans, 1954
Curetis tonkina tonkina Evans, 1954
Curetis tonkina metayet Inoue & Kawazoe, 1964

subfamily: Lycaeninae

genus: Heliophorus
Heliophorus androcles rubida Riley, 1929
Heliophorus brahma Moore, [1858]
Heliophorus brahma mogoka Evans, 1932
Heliophorus brahma major Evans, 1932
Heliophorus delacouri Eliot, 1963
Heliophorus epicles (Godart, [1842])
Heliophorus epicles latilimbata (Fruhstorfer, 1908)
Heliophorus epicles phoenicoparyphus (Holland, 1878)
Heliophorus eventa Fruhstorfer, 1918
Heliophorus ila (de Niceville, [1896])
Heliophorus ila nolus Eliot, 1963
Heliophorus ila chinensis (Fruhstorfer, 1908)
Heliophorus indicus (Fruhstorfer, 1908)
Heliophorus kohimensis elioti Yago, Saigusa & Nakanishi, 2002
Heliophorus smaragdinus Yago & Monastyrskii, 2002

genus: Helleia
Helleia tseng sonephetae Wakahara, Miyamoto & Nakamura, 2008

subfamily: Miletinae

tribe: Miletini

genus: Miletus
Miletus ancon ancon (Doherty, 1889)
Miletus archilochus archilochus (Fruhstorfer, 1913)
Miletus archilochus siamensis (Godfrey, 1916)
Miletus biggsii biggsii (Distant, 1884)
Miletus chinensis learchus Felder & Felder, [1865]
Miletus croton (Doherty, 1889)
Miletus croton croton (Doherty, 1889)
Miletus croton corus Eliot, 1961
Miletus gallus gallus (de Niceville, 1894)
Miletus gigantes (de Niceville, 1894)
Miletus gopara gopara (de Niceville, 1890)
Miletus mallus (Fruhstorfer, 1913)
Miletus mallus mallus (Fruhstorfer, 1913)
Miletus mallus shania (Evans, 1932)
Miletus nymphis fictus Corbet, 1939
Miletus symethus petronius (Distant& Pryer, 1887)

genus: Allotinus
Allotinus corbeti Eliot, 1956
Allotinus davidis Eliot, 1959
Allotinus drumila aphthonius Fruhstorfer, 1914
Allotinus fallax apeus de Niceville, 1895
Allotinus horsfieldi permagnus Fruhstorfer, 1913
Allotinus leogoron leogoron Furhstorfer, [1916]
Allotinus sarrastes Fruhstorfer, 1913
Allotinus strigatus malayanus Corbet, 1939
Allotinus subviolaceus subviolaceus Felder & Felder, [1865]
Allotinus substrigosus substrigosus (Moore, 1884)
Allotinus thalebanus Murayama & Kimura, 1990
Allotinus unicolor Felder & Felder, [1865]
Allotinus unicolor unicolor Felder & Felder, [1865]
Allotinus unicolor rekkia Riley & Godfrey, 1921

genus: Logania
Logania distanti massalia Doherty, 1891
Logania malayica malayica Distant, 1884
Logania marmorata Moore, 1884
Logania marmorata marmorata Moore, 1884
Logania marmorata damis Fruhstorfer, 1914
Logania regina sriwa Distant, 1886
Logania watsoniana de Niceville, 1898

tribe: Liphyrini

genus: Liphyra
Liphyra brassolis brassolis Westwood, [1864]

tribe: Spalgini

genus: Spalgis
Spalgis epeus epeus (Moore, 1878)
Spalgis baiongus Cantlie & Norman, 1960

tribe: Tarakini

genus: Taraka
Taraka hamada hamada (Druce, 1875)
Taraka hamada mendesia Fruhstorfer, 1918
Taraka mahanetra Doherty, 1890

subfamily: Polyommatinae

genus: Castalius
Castalius rosimon rosimon (Fabricius, 1775)

genus: Tarucus
Tarucus callinara Butler, 1886
Tarucus waterstradti dharta Bethune-Baker, [1918]
Tarucus ananda de Niceville, [1884]

genus: Lampides
Lampides boeticus (Linnaeus, 1767)

genus: Caleta
Caleta roxus (Godart, [1842])
Caleta roxus roxana (de Niceville, 1897)
Caleta roxus pothus (Fruhstorfer, 1918)
Caleta elna noliteia (Fruhstorfer, 1918)
Caleta elna elvira (Fruhstorfer, 1918)
Caleta decidia decidia (Hewitson, [1876])

genus: Discolampa
Discolampa ethion (Westwood, [1851])
Discolampa ethion ethion (Westwood, [1851])
Discolampa ethion thalimar (Fruhstorfer, [1922])

genus: Nothodanis
Nothodanis schaeffera annamensis (Fruhstorfer, 1913)

genus: Everes
Everes argiades diporides Chapman, 1909
Everes huegelii dipora (Moore, 1865)
Everes lacturnus lacturnus (Godart, [1824])

genus: Talicada
Talicada metana Riley & Godfrey, 1921
Talicada nyseus (Guerin-Menevill, [1843])
Talicada nyseus annamitica Seitz, [1923]
Talicada nyseus burmana Evans, 1925
Talicada nyseus macbethi Riley, 1932

genus: Azanus
Azanus urios Riley & Godfrey, 1921

genus: Tongeia
Tongeia amplifascia Huang, 2001
Tongeia ion (Leech, 1891)
Tongeia potanini Alpheraky, 1889
Tongeia potanini umbriel (Doherty, 1889)
Tongeia potanini glycon Corbet, 1940

genus: Shijimia
Shijimia moorei moorei (Leech, 1889)

genus: Bothrinia
Bothrinia chennellii celastroides Shirozu & Saigusa, 1962

genus: Pithecops
Pithecops corvus Fruhstorfer, [1919]
Pithecops corvus corvus Fruhstorfer, [1919]
Pithecops corvus correctus Cowan, 1966
Pithecops fulgens fulgens Doherty, 1889

genus: Lycaenopsis
Lycaenopsis haraldus (Fabricius, 1787)
Lycaenopsis haraldus haraldus (Fabricius, 1787)
Lycaenopsis haraldus renonga Riley, 1932
Lycaenopsis haraldus annamitica Eliot and Kawazoe, 1983

genus: Megisba
Megisba malaya sikkima Moore, 1884

genus: Neopithecops
Neopithecops zalmora zalmora (Butler, [1870])

genus: Cebrella
Cebrella pellecebra pellecebra (Fruhstorfer, 1910)

genus: Lestranicus
Lestranicus transpectus (Moore, 1879)

genus: Udara
Udara albocaerulea albocaerulea (Moore, 1879)
Udara dilecta dilecta (Moore, 1879)
Udara placidula howarthi (Cantlie & Norman, 1960)
Udara cyma cyma (Toxopeus, 1927)
Udara akasa sadanobui Eliot & Kawazoe, 1983
Udara selma cerima (Corbet, 1937)

genus: Plautella
Plautella cossaea pambui (Eliot, 1973)

genus: Acytolepis
Acytolepis lilacea indochinensis Eliot & Kawazoe, 1983
Acytolepis puspa (Horsfield, [1828])
Acytolepis puspa lambi (Distant, 1882)
Acytolepis puspa gisca (Fruhstorfer, 1910)

genus: Celatoxia
Celatoxia marginata (de Niceville, [1884])
Celatoxia marginata marginata (de Niceville, [1884])
Celatoxia marginata splendens (Butler, 1900)

genus: Celastrina
Celastrina argiolus iynteana (de Niceville, [1884])
Celastrina lavendularis (Moore, 1877)
Celastrina lavendularis limbata (Moore, 1879)
Celastrina lavendularis isabella Corbet, 1937
Celastrina oreas yunnana Eliot & Kawazoe, 1983
Callenya lenya lenya (Evans, 1932)
Callenya melaena melaena (Doherty, 1899)

genus: Monodontides
Monodontides musina (Snellen, 1892)
Monodontides musina musinoides (Swinhoe, 1910)
Monodontides musina pelides (Fruhstorfer, 1910)

genus: Zizina
Zizina otis (Fabricius, 1787)
Zizina otis sangra (Moore, [1866])
Zizina otis lampa (Corbet, 1940)

genus: Zizeeria
Zizeeria karsandra (Moore, 1865)
Zizeeria maha maha (Kollar, [1844])

genus: Zizula
Zizula hylax hylax (Fabricius, 1775)
Zizula hylax hylax (Fabricius, 1775)
Zizula hylax pygmaea (Snellen, 1876)

genus: Famegana
Famegana alsulus eggletoni (Corbet, 1941)

genus: Chilades
Chilades lajus (Stoll, [1780])
Chilades lajus lajus (Stoll, [1780])
Chilades lajus tavoyanus Evans, 1925

genus: Luthrodes
Luthrodes pandava pandava (Horsfield, [1829])

genus: Freyeria
Freyeria trochylus orientalis Forster, 1980
Freyeria putli (Kollar, [1844])

genus: Euchrysops
Euchrysops cnejus (Fabricius, 1798)

genus: Catochrysops
Catochrysops panormus exiguus (Distant, 1886)
Catochrysops strabo strabo (Fabricius, 1793)

genus: Lampides
Lampides boeticus (Linnaeus, 1767)

genus: Leptotes
Leptotes plinius (Fabricius, 1793)

genus: Jamides
Jamides abdul abdul (Distant, 1886)
Jamides alecto (C.Felder, 1860)
Jamides alecto alocina Swinhoe, 1915
Jamides alecto ageladas (Fruhstorfer, 1915)
Jamides bochus (Stoll, [1782])
Jamides bochus bochus (Stoll, [1782])
Jamides bochus nabonassar (Fruhstorfer, [1916])
Jamides caeruleus caeruleus (H.Druce, 1873)
Jamides celeno (Cramer, [1775])
Jamides celeno celeno (Cramer, [1775])
Jamides celeno aelianus (Fabricius, 1793)
Jamides cyta minna Riley & Corbet, 1938
Jamides elpis pseudelpis (Butler, [1879])
Jamides ferrari evansi Riley & Corbet, 1938
Jamides malaccanus malaccanus (Rober, [1886])
Jamides parasaturatus paramalaccanus Riley & Corbet, 1938
Jamides philatus subditus (Moore, 1886)
Jamides pura pura (Moore, 1886)
Jamides talinga (Kheil, 1884)
Jamides virgulatus nisanca (Fruhstorfer, 1915)
Jamides zebra lakatti Corbet, 1940

genus: Caerulea
Caerulea coeligena (Oberthuer, 1876)

genus: Nacaduba
Nacaduba angusta (H.Druce, 1873)
Nacaduba angusta kerriana Distant, 1886
Nacaduba angusta albida Riley & Godfrey, 1925
Nacaduba berenice (Herrich-Schaffer, 1869)
Nacaduba berenice aphya Fruhstorfer, 1916
Nacaduba berenice icena Fruhstorfer, 1916
Nacaduba beroe (Felder & Felder, 1865)
Nacaduba beroe gythion Fruhstorfer, 1916
Nacaduba beroe neon Fruhstorfer, 1916
Nacaduba calauria malayica Corbet, 1938
Nacaduba kurava (Moore, [1858])
Nacaduba kurava euplea Fruhstorfer, 1916
Nacaduba kurava nemana Fruhstorfer, 1916
Nacaduba hermus (C.Felder, 1860)
Nacaduba hermus nabo Fruhstorfer, 1916
Nacaduba hermus swatipa Corbet, 1938
Nacaduba pactolus continentalis Fruhstorfer, 1916
Nacaduba pavana vajuva Fruhstorfer, 1916
Nacaduba russelli Tite, 1963
Nacaduba sanaya naevia Toxopeus, 1929
Nacaduba subperusia lysa Fruhstorfer, 1916

genus: Ionolyce
Ionolyce helicon merguiana (Moore, 1884)

genus: Prosotas
Prosotas aluta (H.Druce, 1873)
Prosotas aluta coelestis (Wood-Mason & de Niceville, [1887])
Prosotas aluta nanda (de Niceville, 1895)
Prosotas bhutea bhutea (de Niceville, [1884])
Prosotas dubiosa (Semper, [1879])
Prosotas dubiosa indica (Evans, 1925)
Prosotas dubiosa lumpura (Corbet, 1938)
Prosotas gracilis ni (de Niceville, 1902)
Prosotas lutea sivoka (Evans, 1910)
Prosotas nora Felder & Felder, 1860
Prosotas nora ardates (Moore, [1875])
Prosotas nora superdates (Fruhstorfer, [1916])
Prosotas noreia hampsoni (de Niceville, 1885)
Prosotas pia marginata Tite, 1963

genus: Catopyrops
Catopyrops ancyra aberrans (Elwes, [1893])

genus: Petrelaea
Petrelaea dana (de Niceville, [1884])

genus: Una
Una usta usta (Distant, 1886)

genus: Orthomiella
Orthomiella pontis (Elwes, 1887)
Orthomiella pontis pontis (Elwes, 1887)
Orthomiella pontis fukienensis Forster, 1941
Orthomiella rantaizana rovorea (Fruhstorfer, 1918)

genus: Niphanda
Niphanda asialis (de Niceville, 1895)
Niphanda cymbia cymbia de Niceville, [1884]
Niphanda tessellata tessellata Moore, [1875]

genus: Anthene
Anthene emolus (Godart, [1824])
Anthene emolus emolus (Godart, [1824])
Anthene emolus goberus (Fruhstorfer, 1916)
Anthene licates dusuntua Corbet, 1940
Anthene lycaenina (R.Felder, 1868)
Anthene lycaenina lycambes (Hewitson, [1878])
Anthene lycaenina miya (Fruhstorfer, 1916)

subfamily: Aphnaeinae

genus: Cigaritis
Cigaritis evansii ayuthia (Murayama & Kimura, 1990)
Cigaritis gigas Saito & Seki, 2008
Cigaritis kuyaniana (Matsumura, 1919)
Cigaritis learmondi (Tytler, 1940)
Cigaritis leechi (Swinhoe, 1912)
Cigaritis leechi leechi (Swinhoe, 1912)
Cigaritis leechi arooni (Murayama & Kimura, 1990)
Cigaritis lohita (Horsfield, [1829])
Cigaritis lohita himalayanus (Moore, 1884)
Cigaritis lohita senama (Fruhstorfer, [1912])
Cigaritis lohita panasa (Fruhstorfer, [1912])
Cigaritis masaeae (Seki, 2000)
Cigaritis maximus (Elwes, [1893])
Cigaritis miyamotoi Saito & Seki, 2008
Cigaritis rukma (de Niceville, [1889])
Cigaritis seliga (Fruhstorfer, [1912]) seliga (Fruhstorfer, [1912])
Cigaritis syama (Horsfield, [1829])
Cigaritis syama peguanus (Moore, 1884)
Cigaritis syama terana (Fruhstorfer, [1912])
Cigaritis syama sepulveda (Fruhstorfer, [1912])
Cigaritis vixinga davidsoni (Talbot, 1936)
Cigaritis vulcanus tavoyana (Evans, 1925)

subfamily: Theclinae

tribe: Luciini

genus: Hypochrysops
Hypochrysops coelisparsus kerri Riley, 1932

tribe: Loxurini

genus: Drina
Drina donina donina (Hewitson, [1865])
Drina maneia (Hewitson, [1863])

genus: Neomyrina
Neomyrina nivea hiemalis (Godman & Salvin, 1878)

genus: Loxura
Loxura atymnus (Stoll, [1780])
Loxura atymnus continentalis Fruhstorfer, [1912]
Loxura atymnus fuconius Fruhstorfer, [1912]
Loxura cassiopeia cassiopeia Distant, 1884

genus: Yasoda
Yasoda tripunctata (Hewitson, [1863])
Yasoda tripunctata tripunctata (Hewitson, [1863])
Yasoda tripunctata atrinotata Fruhstorfer, [1912]
Yasoda pita dohertyi Fruhstorfer, [1912]
Yasoda androconifera Fruhstorfer, [1912]

genus: Eooxylides
Eooxylides tharis distanti Riley, 1942

genus: Thamala
Thamala marciana (Hewitson, [1863])
Thamala marciana marciana (Hewitson, [1863])
Thamala marciana miniata Moore, [1879]
Thamala marciana sarupa Corbet, 1944

tribe: Cheritrini

genus: Cheritra
Cheritra freja (Fabricius, 1793)
Cheritra freja freja (Fabricius, 1793)
Cheritra freja evansi Cowan, 1965
Cheritrella truncipennis de Niceville, 1887

genus: Ticherra
Ticherra acte (Moore, [1858])
Ticherra acte acte (Moore, [1858])
Ticherra acte liviana Fruhstorfer, [1912]

genus: Ahmetia
Ahmetia achaja (Fruhstorfer, [1912])
Ahmetia achaja achaja (Fruhstorfer, [1912])
Ahmetia achaja jamadai (Saito, 2008)

genus: Drupadia
Drupadia ravindra (Horsfield, [1828])
Drupadia ravindra moorei (Distant, 1882)
Drupadia ravindra boisduvalii Moore, 1884
Drupadia ravindra corbeti Cowan, 1974
Drupadia rufotaenia (Fruhstorfer, [1912])
Drupadia rufotaenia rufotaenia (Fruhstorfer, [1912])
Drupadia rufotaenia archbaldi (Evans, 1932)
Drupadia theda (Felder & Felder, 1862)
Drupadia theda thesmia (Hewitson, [1863])
Drupadia theda fabricii Moore, 1884
Drupadia theda renonga (Corbet, 1938)
Drupadia niasica scudderii (Doherty, 1889)
Drupadia estella nicevillei (Doherty, 1889)
Drupadia scaeva (Hewitson, [1863])
Drupadia scaeva scaeva (Hewitson, [1863])
Drupadia scaeva melisa (Hewitson, [1869])
Drupadia scaeva cooperi (Tytler, 1940)
Drupadia johorensis (Cowan, 1958)
Drupadia cinesoides (de Niceville, 1889)

tribe: Amblypodiini

genus: Iraota
Iraota timoleon timoleon (Stoll, [1790])
Iraota rochana boswelliana Distant, 1885
Iraota distanti distanti (Staudinger, 1889)

genus: Amblypodia
Amblypodia narada taooana Moore, [1879]
Amblypodia anita anita Hewitson, 1862

tribe: Arhopalini

genus: Arhopala
Arhopala aberrans (de Niceville, [1889])
Arhopala abseus (Hewitson, 1862)
Arhopala abseus abseus (Hewitson, 1862)
Arhopala abseus indicus Riley, 1923
Arhopala abseus ophiala Corbet, 1941
Arhopala ace arata Tytler, 1915
Arhopala aeeta de Niceville, 1893
Arhopala amantes amatrix de Niceville, 1891
Arhopala centaurus nakula (Felder & Felder, 1860)
Arhopala kinabala H.H.Druce, 1895
Arhopala similis H.H.Druce, 1895
Arhopala ijanensis Bethune-Baker, 1897
Arhopala aedias (Hewitson, 1862)
Arhopala aedias agnis Felder & Felder, [1865]
Arhopala aedias meritatas Corbet, 1941
Arhopala agaba (Hewitson, 1862)
Arhopala agelastus (Hewitson, 1862)
Arhopala agelastus agelastus (Hewitson, 1862)
 Arhopala agelastus perissa Doherty, 1889
Arhopala agesilaus gesa Corbet, 1941
Arhopala agrata de Niceville, 1890
Arhopala agrata agrata de Niceville, 1890
Arhopala agrata binghami Corbet, 1946
Arhopala aida aida de Niceville, 1889
Arhopala alaconia media Evans, 1957
Arhopala alesia sacharja Fruhstorfer, 1914
Arhopala allata pandora Corbet, 1941
Arhopala alitaeus mirabella Doherty, 1889
Arhopala ammon ammon (Hewitson, 1862)
Arhopala ammonides (Doherty, 1891)
Arhopala ammonides ammonides (Doherty, 1891)
Arhopala amphimuta (Felder & Felder, 1860)
Arhopala amphimuta amphimuta (Felder & Felder, 1860)
Arhopala amphimuta milleriana Corbet, 1941
Arhopala anarte anarte (Hewitson, 1862)
Arhopala anthelus (Westwood, [1852])
Arhopala anthelus anthea (Evans, 1925)
Arhopala anthelus grahami Corbet, 1941
Arhopala antimuta antimuta Felder & Felder, [1865]
Arhopala ariana (Evans, 1925)
Arhopala ariana ariana (Evans, 1925)
Arhopala ariana wilcocksi Eliot, 1973
Arhopala ariel (Doherty, 1891)
Arhopala aroa esava Corbet, 1941
Arhopala arvina (Hewitson, [1863])
Arhopala arvina aboe de Niceville, 1895
Arhopala arvina adalitas Corbet, 1941
Arhopala asopia (Hewitson, [1869])
Arhopala asinarus Felder & Felder, 1865
Arhopala asinarus asinarus Felder & Felder, [1865]
Arhopala asinarus tounguva (Grose-Smith, 1887)
Arhopala athada (Staudinger, 1889)
Arhopala athada athada (Staudinger, 1889)
Arhopala athada apha de Niceville, 1895
Arhopala atosia malayana Bethune-Baker, 1903
Arhopala atrax (Hewitson, 1862)
Arhopala aurea (Hewitson, 1862)
Arhopala aurelia (Evans, 1925)
Arhopala avatha avatha de Niceville, [1896]
Arhopala barami woodii Ollenbach, 1921
Arhopala bazaloides bazaloides (Hewitson, [1878])
Arhopala bazalus (Hewitson, 1862)
Arhopala bazalus teesta (de Niceville, 1886)
Arhopala bazalus zalinda Corbet, 1941
Arhopala birmana birmana (Moore, [1884])
Arhopala buddha cooperi (Evans, 1925)
Arhopala camdana camdana Corbet, 1941
Arhopala camdeo Moore, [1858]
Arhopala delta Evans, 1957
Arhopala cleander (C.Felder, 1860)
Arhopala cleander regia (Evans, 1925)
Arhopala cleander aphadantas Corbet, 1941
Arhopala comica de Niceville, 1900
Arhopala corinda (Hewitson, [1869])
Arhopala corinda acestes de Niceville, 1893
Arhopala corinda corestes Corbet, 1941
Arhopala democritus (Fabricius, 1793)
Arhopala democritus democritus (Fabricius, 1793)
Arhopala democritus lycaenaria (Felder & Felder, 1860)
Arhopala dispar dispar Riley & Godfrey, 1921
Arhopala elopura dama Swinhoe, 1910
Arhopala epimete duessa Doherty, 1889
Arhopala epimuta elsiei (Evans, 1925)
Arhopala eumolphus (Cramer, [1780])
Arhopala eumolphus eumolphus (Cramer, [1780])
Arhopala eumolphus maxwelli (Distant, 1885)
Arhopala evansi Corbet, 1941
Arhopala fulla (Hewitson, 1862)
Arhopala fulla ignara Riley & Godfrey, 1921
Arhopala fulla intaca Corbet, 1941
Arhopala ganesa watsoni Evans, 1912
Arhopala hellenore hellenore Doherty, 1889
Arhopala hellada ozana Fruhstorfer, 1914
Arhopala horsfieldi eurysthenes Fruhstorfer, 1914
Arhopala hypomuta hypomuta (Hewitson, 1862)
Arhopala inornata inornata (Felder & Felder, 1860)
Arhopala khamti Doherty, 1891
Arhopala labuana Bethune-Baker, 1896
Arhopala lurida lurida Corbet, 1941
Arhopala major major (Staudinger, 1889)
Arhopala metamuta metamuta (Hewitson, [1863])
Arhopala milleri Corbet, 1941
Arhopala moolaiana (Moore, [1879])
Arhopala moolaiana maya (Evans, 1932)
Arhopala moolaiana yajuna Corbet, 1941
Arhopala moorei busa Corbet, 1941
Arhopala muta (Hewitson, 1862)
Arhopala muta merguiana Corbet, 1941
Arhopala muta maranda Corbet, 1941
Arhopala myrzala (Hewitson, [1869])
Arhopala myrzala conjuncta Corbet, 1941
Arhopala myrzala lammas Corbet, 1941
Arhopala nicevillei Bethune-Baker, 1903
Arhopala norda ronda Eliot, 1992
Arhopala normani Eliot, 1972
Arhopala oenea oenea (Hewitson, [1869])
Arhopala opalina opalina (Moore, [1884])
Arhopala opalina azata de Niceville, [1896]
Arhopala opalina sphendale Fruhstorfer, 1914
Arhopala paraganesa (de Niceville, 1882)
Arhopala paraganesa zephyretta (Doherty, 1891)
Arhopala paraganesa mendava Corbet, 1941
Arhopala paralea (Evans, 1925)
Arhopala paramuta paramuta (de Niceville, [1884])
Arhopala perimuta (Moore, [1858])
Arhopala perimuta perimuta (Moore, [1858])
Arhopala perimuta regina Corbet, 1941
Arhopala phaenops sandakani Bethune-Baker, 1896
Arhopala phanda phanda Corbet, 1941
Arhopala pseudomuta ariavana Corbet, 1941
Arhopala rama ramosa (Evans, 1925)
Arhopala selta selta (Hewitson, [1869])
Arhopala silhetensis (Hewitson, 1862)
Arhopala silhetensis silhetensis (Hewitson, 1862)
Arhopala silhetensis adorea de Niceville, 1890
Arhopala singla (de Niceville, 1885)
Arhopala stinga (Evans, 1957)
Arhopala sublustris Bethune-Baker, 1904
Arhopala sublustris ralanda Corbet, 1941
Arhopala sublustris ridleyi Corbet, 1941
Arhopala trogon trogon (Distant, 1884)
Arhopala varro varro Fruhstorfer, 1914
Arhopala vihara hirava Corbet, 1941
Arhopala wildeyana havea Corbet, 1941
Arhopala zambra zambra Swinhoe, [1911]
Arhopala zylda elioti Corbet, 1941

genus: Flos
Flos adriana (de Niceville, [1884])
Flos anniella (Hewitson, 1862)
Flos anniella anniella (Hewitson, 1862)
Flos anniella artegal Doherty, 1889
Flos apidanus ahamus Doherty, 1891
Flos areste (Hewitson, 1862)
Flos asoka (de Niceville, [1884])
Flos chinensis chinensis (Felder & Felder, [1865])
Flos diardi (Hewitson, 1862)
Flos diardi diardi (Hewitson, 1862)
Flos diardi capeta (Hewitson, [1878])
Flos fulgida (Hewitson, [1863])
Flos fulgida fulgida (Hewitson, [1863])
 Flos fulgida singhapura (Distant, 1885)
Flos morphina morphina (Distant, 1884)

genus: Thaduka
Thaduka multicaudata multicaudata Moore, [1879]

genus: Mahathala
Mahathala ameria (Hewitson, 1862)
Mahathala ameria ameria (Hewitson, 1862)
Mahathala ameria hainani Bethune-Baker, 1903
Mahathala ameria burmana Talbot, 1942
Mahathala ariadeva ariadeva Fruhstorfer, 1908

genus: Apporasa
Apporasa atkinsoni (Hewitson, [1869])

genus: Semanga
Semanga superba (H.Druce, 1873)
Semanga superba deliciosa Seitz, [1926]
Semanga superba siamensis Talbot, 1936

genus: Mota
Mota massyla (Hewitson, [1869])

genus: Surendra
Surendra quercetorum quercetorum (Moore, [1858])
Surendra florimel Doherty, 1889
Surendra vivarna (Horsfield, [1829])
Surendra vivarna amisena (Hewitson, 1862)
Surendra vivarna neritos (Fruhstorfer, 1907)

genus: Zinaspa
Zinaspa todara (Moore, [1884])
Zinaspa todara karennia (Evans, 1925)

tribe: Catapaecilmatini

genus: Catapaecilma
Catapaecilma major H.H.Druce, 1895
Catapaecilma major emas (Fruhstorfer, [1912])
Catapaecilma major albicans Corbet, 1941
Catapaecilma elegans zephyria Fruhstorfer, 1915
Catapaecilma subochrea Elwes, [1893]

tribe: Deudorigini

genus: Artipe
Artipe eryx horiella (Matsumura, 1929)

genus: Deudorix
Deudorix epijarbas menesicles Fruhstorfer, 1911
Deudorix rapaloides (Naritomi, 1911)
Deudorix repercussa sankakuhonis Matsumura, 1938

genus: Rapala
Rapala caerulea liliacea Nire, 1920
Rapala duma Hewitson, 1878
Rapala melida nicevillei Swinhoe, 1911
Rapala nissa hirayamana Matsumura, 1926
Rapala takasagonis Matsumura, 1929
Rapala varuna formosana Fruhstorfer, 1911

genus: Sinthusa
Sinthusa chandrana kuyaniana (Matsumura, 1919)
Pamela dudgeonii (de Niceville, 1894)

tribe: Eumaeini

genus: Novosatsuma
Novosatsuma oppocoenosa Johnson, 1992

genus: Satyrium
Satyrium austrinum (Murayama, 1943)
Satyrium esakii (Shirozu, 1942)
Satyrium eximium mushanum (Matsumura, 1929)
Satyrium formosanum (Matsumura, 1910)
Satyrium inouei (Shirozu, 1959)
Satyrium tanakai (Shirozu, 1943)
Satyrium mackwoodi (Evans, 1914)

genus: Fixsenia
Fixsenia eximia (Fixsen, 1887)
Fixsenia yangi (Riley, 1939)
Fixsenia tateishii Matsumoto, 2006

genus: Ahlbergia
Ahlbergia pluto (Leech, 1893)

tribe: Horagini

genus: Horaga
Horaga onyx onyx (Moore, [1858])
Horaga syrinx moulmeina Moore, [1884]
Horaga albimacula viola Moore, 1882
Horaga amethysta purpurescens Corbet, 1941
Horaga takanamii Seki & Saito, [2004]

tribe: Hypolycaenini

genus: Hypolycaena
Hypolycaena othona Hewitson, 1865
Hypolycaena kina inari (Wileman, 1908)

tribe: Iolaini

genus: Britomartis
Britomartis cleoboides cleoboides (Elwes, [1893])

genus: Bullis
Bullis buto cowani Corbet, 1940
Bullis stigmata sylvicola Seki, 1997

genus: Charana
Charana mandarina mandarina (Hewitson, [1863])

genus: Creon
Creon cleobis (Godart, [1824])
Creon cleobis cleobis (Godart, [1824])
Creon cleobis queda (Corbet, 1983)

genus: Dacalana
Dacalana burmana Moore, 1884
Dacalana cotys (Hewitson, [1865])
Dacalana cremera ricardi (Eliot, 1959)
Dacalana inorthodoxa Seki & Saito, 2006
Dacalana penicilligera (de Niceville, 1890)
Dacalana sinhara sinhara Fruhstorfer, 1914
Dacalana vidura azyada (Fruhstorfer, 1914)

genus: Jacoona
Jacoona anasuja nigerrima Corbet, 1948

genus: Maneca
Maneca bhotea Moore, 1884

genus: Manto
Manto hypoleuca terana (Seitz, [1926])

genus: Mantoides
Mantoides gama gama (Distant, 1886)

genus: Neocheritra
Neocheritra amrita amrita (Felder & Felder, 1860)
Neocheritra fabronia fabronia (Hewitson, [1878])

genus: Pratapa
Pratapa contractus (Leech, 1890)
Pratapa deva Moore, [1858]
Pratapa deva lila Moore, [1884]
Pratapa deva relata (Distant, 1884)
Pratapa icetas extensa Evans, 1925
Pratapa icetoides (Elwes, [1893])
Pratapa icetoides icetoides (Elwes, [1893])
Pratapa icetoides calculis H.H.Druce, 1895

genus: Purlisa
Purlisa gigantea gigantea (Distant, 1881)

genus: Rachana
Rachana jalindra (Horsfield, [1829])
Rachana jalindra burbona (Hewitson, [1878])
Rachana jalindra indra (Moore, [1884])

genus: Suasa
Suasa lisides (Hewitson, [1863])
Suasa lisides lisides (Hewitson, [1863])
Suasa lisides madaura Fruhstorfer, [1912]

genus: Tajuria
Tajuria albiplaga de Niceville, 1887
Tajuria albiplaga albiplaga de Niceville, 1887
Tajuria albiplaga alixae Eliot, 1973
Tajuria berenis larutensis Pendlebury, 1933
Tajuria cippus (Fabricius, 1798)
Tajuria cippus cippus (Fabricius, 1798)
Tajuria cippus malcolmi Riley & Godfrey, 1925
Tajuria deudorix ingeni Corbet, 1948
Tajuria diaeus diaeus (Hewitson, [1865])
Tajuria dominus H.H.Druce, 1895
Tajuria dominus dominus H.H.Druce, 1895
Tajuria dominus culta (de Niceville, [1896])
Tajuria illurgis illurgis (Hewitson, [1869])
Tajuria illurgioides de Niceville, 1890
Tajuria isaeus (Hewitson, [1865])
Tajuria isaeus tyro de Niceville, 1895
Tajuria isaeus verna Corbet, 1940
Tajuria ister (Hewitson, [1865])
Tajuria ister ister (Hewitson, [1865])
Tajuria ister tussis H.H.Druce, 1895
Tajuria luculenta (Leech, 1890)
Tajuria luculenta luculenta (Leech, 1890)
Tajuria luculenta taorana Corbet, 1940
Tajuria maculata (Hewitson, [1865])
Tajuria mantra (Felder & Felder, 1860)
Tajuria mantra mantra (Felder & Felder, 1860)
Tajuria mantra ogyges (de Niceville, 1895)
Tajuria megistia (Hewitson, [1869])
Tajuria megistia megistia (Hewitson, [1869])
Tajuria megistia thria de Niceville, [1896]
Tajuria melastigma de Niceville, 1887
Tajuria sekii Saito, 2005
Tajuria shigehoi Seki & Saito, 2006
Tajuria sunia Pendlebury, 1933
Tajuria yajna ellisi Evans, 1925

tribe: Remelanini

genus: Pseudotajuria
Pseudotajuria donatana donatana (de Niceville, [1889])

genus: Remelana
Remelana jangala (Horsfield, [1829])
Remelana jangala travana (Hewitson, [1865])
Remelana jangala ravata (Moore, [1866])

genus: Ancema
Ancema blanka (de Niceville, 1894)
Ancema blanka blanka (de Niceville, 1894)
Ancema blanka minturna (Fruhstorfer, [1912])
Ancema ctesia ctesia (Hewitson, [1865])

tribe: Theclini

genus: Amblopala
Amblopala avidiena y-fasciata (Sonan, 1929)

genus: Antigius
Antigius attila obsoletus (Takeuchi, 1923)
Antigius shizuyai Koiwaya, 2003

genus: Araragi
Araragi enthea morisonensis (M. Inoue, 1942)

genus: Teratozephyrus
Teratozephyrus kimurai kimurai Koiwaya, 2002
Teratozephyrus nuwai Koiwaya, 1996

genus: Neozephyrus
Neozephyrus uedai kachinus Koiwaya, 2002

genus: Chrysozephyrus
Chrysozephyrus disparatus (Howarth, 1957)
Chrysozephyrus disparatus disparatus (Howarth, 1957)
Chrysozephyrus disparatus pseudoletha (Howarth, 1957)
Chrysozephyrus duma (Hewitson, [1869])
Chrysozephyrus dumoides (Tytler, 1915)
Chrysozephyrus esakii raja Sugiyama, 1993
Chrysozephyrus haradai Koiwaya, 2000
Chrysozephyrus hatoyamai hatoyamai Fujioka, 2003
Chrysozephyrus kabrua (Tytler, 1915)
Chrysozephyrus kabrua philipi Eliot, 1987
Chrysozephyrus kabrua ueharai Koiwaya & Osada, 1998
Chrysozephyrus intermedius (Tytler, 1915)
Chrysozephyrus intermedius lao Koiwaya & Osada, 1998
Chrysozephyrus intermedius tamamitsui Morita, 2001
Chrysozephyrus inthanonensis Kimura & Murayama, 1990
Chrysozephyrus inthanonensis inthanonensis Murayama & Kimura, 1990
Chrysozephyrus inthanonensis miyashitai Morita, 2003
Chrysozephyrus nigroapicalis (Howarth, 1957)
Chrysozephyrus nigroapicalis khambounei Koiwaya & Osada, 1998
Chrysozephyrus nigroapicalis katsurai Morita, 2003
Chrysozephyrus scintillans (Leech, 1893)
Chrysozephyrus souleana myanmarensis Koiwaya, 2000
Chrysozephyrus paona (Tytler, 1915)
Chrysozephyrus tienmushanus Shirôzu & Yamamoto 1959
Chrysozephyrus tytleri yodoei Fujioka, 2003
Chrysozephyrus vietnamicus vietnamicus Koiwaya, 2003
Chrysozephyrus vittatus (Tytler, 1915)
Chrysozephyrus vittatus phoopan Koiwaya, 2002
Chrysozephyrus vittatus akikoae Morita, 2002
Chrysozephyrus wakaharai wakaharai Koiwaya, 2002
Chrysozephyrus watsoni kameii Koiwaya, 2000

genus: Cordelia
Cordelia comes wilemaniella (Matsumura, 1929)

genus: Euaspa
Euaspa forsteri (Esaki & Shirozu, 1943)
Euaspa milionia formosana Nomura, 1931
Euaspa tayal (Esaki & Shirozu, 1943)

genus: Iratsume
Iratsume orsedice suzukii (Sonan, 1940)

genus: Japonica
Japonica patungkoanui Matsumura, 1956

genus: Leucantigius
Leucantigius atayalicus (Shirozu & Murayama, 1943)

genus: Neozephyrus
Neozephyrus taiwanus (Wileman, 1908)

genus: Ravenna
Ravenna nivea (Nire, 1920)

genus: Sibataniozephyrus
Sibataniozephyrus kuafui Hsu & Lin, 1994

genus: Teratozephyrus
Teratozephyrus arisanus (Wileman, 1909)
Teratozephyrus elatus Hsu & Lu, 2005
Teratozephyrus yugaii (Kano, 1928)

genus: Ussuriana
Ussuriana michaelis (Oberthur, 1880)
Ussuriana michaelis takarana (Araki & Hirayama, 1941)

genus: Wagimo
Wagimo sulgeri insularis (Shirozu, 1957)

genus: Shirozuozephyrus
Shirozuozephyrus kirbariensis (Tytler, 1915)
Shirozuozephyrus kirbariensis mapanputicus (Koiwaya, 2000)
Shirozuozephyrus kirbariensis machimurai (Koiwaya, 2002)
Shirozuozephyrus masatoshii (Koiwaya, 2002)

genus: Inomataozephyrus
Inomataozephyrus assamicus (Tytler, 1915)

genus: Kawazoeozephyrus
Kawazoeozephyrus mushaellus (Matsumura, 1938)
 Kawazoeozephyrus mushaellus sakaguchii (Koiwaya, 2002)
Kawazoeozephyrus jiroi (Koiwaya, 2002)

genus: Thermozephyrus
Thermozephyrus ataxus zulla (Tytler, 1915)

genus: Howarthia
Howarthia hishikawai Koiwaya, 2000
Howarthia kimurai Koiwaya, 2002

genus: Hayashikeia
Hayashikeia ueharai (Koiwaya, 2002)

genus: Nanlingozephyrus
Nanlingozephyrus bella (Hsu, 1997)
Nanlingozephyrus bella bella (Hsu, 1997)
Nanlingozephyrus bella lao (Koiwaya, 2002)

genus: Leucantigius
Leucantigius atayalicus (Shirôzu & Murayama, 1943)

genus: Yamamotozephyrus
Yamamotozephyrus kwangtungensis hainanus (Koiwaya, 1993)

genus: Euaspa
Euaspa forsteri ueharai Koiwaya, 2002
Euaspa milionia milionia Hewitson, [1869]
Euaspa wuyishana chohtarohi Funahashi, 2003
Euaspa hishikawai Koiwaya 2002
Euaspa hishikawai hishikawai Koiwaya, 2002
Euaspa hishikawai minaei Monastyrskii & Devyatkin, 2003
Euaspa koizumii Koiwaya, 2002
Euaspa nishimurai Koiwaya, 2002

genus: Proteuaspa
Proteuaspa akikoae Koiwaya & Morita, 2003

Family Nymphalidae 

subfamily: Heliconiinae

genus: Acraea
Acraea issoria (Hubner, [1819])
Acraea issoria vestalina (Fruhstorfer, 1906)
Acraea issoria sordice (Fruhstorfer, 1914)
Acraea violae (Fabricius, 1775)

genus: Argynnis
Argynnis hyperbius (Linnaeus, 1763)
Argynnis hyperbius hyperbius (Linnaeus, 1763)
Argynnis hyperbius lates Tsukada, 1985
Argynnis laodice (Pallas, 1771)
Argynnis childreni Gray, 1831

genus: Cupha
Cupha erymanthis erymanthis (Drury, [1773])
Cupha erymanthis lotis (Sulzer, 1776)
Cupha erymanthis tiomana (Corbet, 1940

genus: Phalanta
Phalanta phalantha phalantha (Drury, [1773])
Phalanta alcippe alcippoides (Moore, [1900])

genus: Vagrans
Vagrans sinha sinha (Kollar, [1844])

genus: Vindula
Vindula erota erota (Fabricius, 1793)
Vindula dejone erotella (Butler, [1879])

genus: Cirrochroa
Cirrochroa tyche Felder & Felder, 1861
Cirrochroa tyche mithila Moore, 1872
Cirrochroa tyche rotundata Butler, [1879]
Cirrochroa tyche aurica Eliot, 1978
Cirrochroa aoris olivacea de Niceville, 1886
Cirrochroa surya siamensis Fruhstorfer, 1906
Cirrochroa emalea emalea (Guerin-Meneville, [1843])
Cirrochroa orissa orissa Felder & Felder, 1860
Cirrochroa chione Riley & Godfrey, 1921
Cirrochroa satellita satellita Butler, 1869
Cirrochroa kishii Saito & Inayoshi, 2009
Cirrochroa malaya malaya C. & R. Felder, 1860

genus: Paduca
Paduca fasciata fasciata (Felder & Felder, 1860)

genus: Terinos
Terinos atlita atlita (Fabricius, 1787)
Terinos atlita fulminans Butler, 1869
Terinos atlita teuthras Hewitson, 1862
Terinos atlita miletum Oberthur, 1897
Terinos clarissa Boisduval, 1836
Terinos clarissa nympha Wallace, 1869
Terinos clarissa aurensis (Eliot, 1978
Terinos clarissa malayana Fruhstorfer, 1906
Terinos clarissa falcata Fruhstorfer, 1898
Terinos terpander terpander Hewitson, 1862
Terinos terpander robertsia Butler, 1867
Terinos terpander blachieri Fruhstorfer, 1914
Terinos terpander intermedia Godfrey, 1916
Terinos terpander tiomanensis Eliot, 1978

genus: Cethosia
Cethosia biblis (Drury, [1773])
Cethosia biblis biblis (Drury, [1773])
Cethosia biblis perakana Fruhstorfer, 1902
Cethosia biblis pemanggilensis Eliot, 1978
Cethosia cyane euanthes Fruhstorfer, 1912
Cethosia hypsea hypsina Felder & Felder, [1867]
Cethosia hypsea elioti Okubo, 1983
Cethosia methypsea methypsea Butler, [1879]

subfamily: Morphinae

tribe: Amathusiini

genus: Aemona
Aemona amathusia amathusia (Hewitson, 1868)
Aemona implicata Monastyrskii & Devyatkin, 2003
Aemona kontumei Monastyrskii & Devyatkin, 2003
Aemona lena Atkinson, 1871
Aemona simulatrix Monastyrskii & Devyatkin, 2003

genus: Amathusia
Amathusia phidippus phidippus (Linnaeus, 1763)
Amathusia friderici holmanhunti Corbet & Pendlebury, 1936
Amathusia schoenbergi Honrath, [1888]
Amathusia ochraceofusca Honrath, [1888]
Amathusia masina malaya Corbet & Pendlebury, 1936

genus: Amathuxidia
Amathuxidia amythaon (Doubleday, 1847)
Amathuxidia amythaon amythaon (Doubleday, 1847)
Amathuxidia amythaon dilucida (Honrath, 1884)
Amathuxidia amythaon annamensis Talbot, 1932

genus: Discophora
Discophora aestheta Monastyrskii & Devyatkin, 2003
Discophora deo de Niceville, 1898
Discophora deo deo de Niceville, 1898
Discophora deo fruhstorferi Stichel, 1901
Discophora necho engamon Fruhstorfer, 1911
Discophora sondaica Boisduval, 1836
Discophora sondaica zal Westwood, [1851]
Discophora sondaica despoliata Stichel, 1902
Discophora sondaica tulliana Stichel, 1905
Discophora timora Westwood, [1850]
Discophora timora timora Westwood, [1850]
Discophora timora perakensis Stichel, 1900

genus: Enispe
Enispe cycnus cycnus Westwood, [1851]
Enispe duranius Fruhstorfer, 1911
Enispe duranius intermedia Rothschild, 1916
Enispe duranius corbeti Pendlebury, 1933
Enispe euthymius (Doubleday, 1845)
Enispe euthymius euthymius (Doubleday, 1845)
Enispe eutymius sychaeus Brooks, 1949

genus: Faunis
Faunis aerope excelsa (Fruhstorfer, 1901)
Faunis arcesilaus (Fabricius, 1787)
Faunis canens arcesilas Stichel, 1933
Faunis eumeus incerta (Staudinger, [1887])
Faunis gracilis (Butler, 1867)
Faunis kirata (de Niceville, 1891)

genus: Melanocyma
Melanocyma faunula (Westwood, 1850)
Melanocyma faunula faunula (Westwood, 1850)
Melanocyma faunula kimurai Saitoh, 2003

genus: Stichophthalma
Stichophthalma camadeva camadevoides de Niceville, 1899
Stichophthalma cambodia (Hewitson, [1862])
Stichophthalma fruhstorferi Rober, 1903
Stichophthalma godfreyi Rothschild, 1916
Stichophthalma howqua (Westwood, 1851)
Stichophthalma howqua tonkiniana Fruhstorfer, 1901
Stichophthalma howqua iapetus Brooks, 1949
Stichophthalma louisa (Wood-Mason, 1877)
Stichophthalma louisa louisa (Wood-Mason, 1877)
Stichophthalma louisa mathilda Janet, 1905
Stichophthalma louisa siamensis Rothschild, 1916
Stichophthalma louisa ranohngensis Okano, 1985
Stichophthalma louisa eamesi Monastyrskii, Devyatkin & Uémura, 2000
Stichophthalma neumogeni regulus Brooks, 1949
Stichophthalma uemurai Nishimura, 1998
Stichophthalma uemurai uemurai Nishimura, 1998
Stichophthalma uemurai gialaii Monastyrskii & Devyatkin, 2000

genus: Thaumantis
Thaumantis diores Doubleday, 1845
Thaumantis diores diores Doubleday, 1845
Thaumantis diores splendens Tytler, 1939
Thaumantis klugius lucipor Westwood, [1851]
Thaumantis noureddin noureddin Westwood, [1851]
Thaumantis odana pishuna Fruhstorfer, 1905

genus: Thauria
Thauria aliris (Westwood, [1858])
Thauria aliris pseudaliris (Butler, [1877])
Thauria aliris intermedia Crowley, 1896
Thauria lathyi Fruhstorfer, 1901
Thautia lathyi lathyi Fruhstorfer, 1901
Thauria lathyi siamensis Rothschild, 1916
Thauria lathyi gabrieli Brooks, 1937

genus: Zeuxidia
Zeuxidia amethystus amethystus Butler, 1865
Zeuxidia aurelius aurelius (Cramer, [1777])
Zeuxidia doubledayi doubledayi Westwood, [1851]
Zeuxidia masoni Moore, [1879]
Zeuxidia sapphirus Monastyrskii & Devyatkin, 2003

subfamily: Limenitidinae

genus: Pantoporia
Pantoporia aureia (Staudinger, 1886)
Pantoporia aurelia aurelia (Staudinger, 1886)
Pantoporia aurelia boma Eliot, 1969
Pantoporia bieti (Oberthur, 1894)
Pantoporia bieti paona (Tytler, 1915)
Pantoporia dindinga (Butler, [1879])
Pantoporia hordonia hordonia (Stoll, [1790])
Pantoporia paraka paraka (Butler, [1879])
Pantoporia sandaka davidsoni Eliot, 1969

genus: Lasippa
Lasippa heliodore heliodore (Fabricius, 1787)
Lasippa monata monata (Weyenbergh, 1874)
Lasippa monata monata(Weyenbergh, 1874)
Lasippa monata khoai Saito & Inayoshi, 2014
Lasippa tiga (Moore, 1858)
Lasippa tiga camboja (Moore, 1879)
Lasippa tiga siaka (Moore, 1881)
Lasippa viraja viraja (Moore, 1872)

genus: Neptis
Neptis ananta learmondi Tytler, 1940
Neptis anjana decerna (Fruhstorfer, 1908)
Neptis antilope antilope Leech, 1890
Neptis armandia (Oberthur, 1876)
Neptis armandia pila Tytler, 1940
Neptis armandia manardia Eliot, 1969
Neptis armandia morrisi Monastyrskii & Devyatkin, 2003
Neptis capnodes pandoces Eliot, 1969
Neptis cartica Moore, 1872
Neptis cartica cartica Moore, 1872
Neptis cartica burmana de Niceville, 1886
Neptis cartica teshirogii Saito & Inayoshi, 2014
Neptis clinia Moore, 1872
Neptis clinia susruta Moore, 1872
Neptis clinia leuconata Butler, [1879]
Neptis dejeani cuongi Saito & Inayoshi, 2014
Neptis cydippe Leech 1890
Neptis duryodana nesia Fruhstorfer, 1908
Neptis genulfa miennamica Monastyrskii & Devyatkin, 2003
Neptis harita Moore, [1875]
Neptis harita harita Moore, [1875]
Neptis harita preeyai Kimura, 1993
Neptis hylas (Linnaeus, 1758)
Neptis hylas kamarupa Moore, 1874
Neptis hylas papaja Moore, [1875]
Neptis ilira cindia Eliot, 1969
Neptis jumbah jumbah Moore, 1857
Neptis leucoporos Fruhstorfer, 1908
Neptis leucoporos leucoporos Fruhstorfer, 1908
Neptis leucoporos cresina Fruhstorfer, 1908
Neptis magadha Felder & Felder, [1867]
Neptis magadha magadha Felder & Felder, [1867]
Neptis magadha charon Butler, 1875
Neptis magadha annamitica Fruhstorfer, 1908
Neptis manasa Moore, 1857
Neptis manasa manasa Moore, 1857
Neptis manasa narcissina Oberthur, 1906
Neptis manasa mientrunga Monastyrskii, 2012
Neptis miah Moore, 1857
Neptis miah nolana H.Druce, 1874
Neptis miah batara Moore, 1881
Neptis miah disopa Swinhoe, 1893
Neptis miah thaithummakulorum Saito & Inayoshi, 2014
Neptis namba namba Tytler, 1915
Neptis narayana dubernardi Eliot, 1969
Neptis nashona Swinhoe, 1896
Neptis nashona aagaardi Riley, 1932
Neptis nashona chapa Eliot, 1969
Neptis nashona tamamitsui Saito & Inayoshi, 2014
Neptis nashona kishii Saito & Inayoshi, 2014
Neptis nata Moore, 1857
Neptis nata adipala Moore, 1872
Neptis nata gononata Butler, 1879
Neptis nemorum nemorum Oberhur, 1906
Neptis omeroda omeroda Moore, [1875]
Neptis philyra melior Hall, 1930
Neptis philyroides mienbaca Monastyrskii & Devyatkin, 2003
Neptis pseudovikasi (Moore, 1899)
Neptis radha radha Moore, [1858]
Neptis sankara (Kollar, [1844])
Neptis sankara guiltoides Tytler, 1940
Neptis sankara sugimotoi Saito & Inayoshi, 2014
Neptis sappho astola Moore, 1872
Neptis sedata Sasaki, 1982
Neptis soma shania Evans, 1924
Neptis themis theodora Oberhur, 1906
Neptis transita Monastyrskii, 2005
Neptis zaida Westwood, 1850
Neptis zaida putoia Evans, 1932
Neptis zaida hasegawai Saito & Inayoshi, 2014
Neptis zaida inayoshii Saito, 2014
Neptis zaida prasobchoki Saito & Inayoshi, 2014

genus: Phaedyma
Phaedyma armariola Monastyrskii, 2005
Phaedyma aspasia aspasia (Leech, 1890)
Phaedyma columella (Cramer, [1780])
Phaedyma columella columella (Cramer, [1780])
Phaedyma columella martabana (Moore, 1881)

genus: Athyma
Athyma abiasa clerica Butler, 1879
Athyma asura Moore, [1858]
Athyma asura asura Moore, [1858]
Athyma asura idita Moore, 1858
Athyma cama ambra Staudinger, 1892
Athyma cama camasa (Fruhstorfer, 1906)
Athyma clerica clerica Butler, [1879]
Athyma jina jina Moore, [1858]
Athyma kanwa Moore, 1858
Athyma kanwa kanwa Moore, 1858
Athyma kanwa phorkys (Fruhstorfer, 1912)
Athyma larymna (Doubleday, [1848])
Athyma larymna selessana Fruhstorfer, 1906
Athyma larymna siamensis Fruhstorfer, 1906
Athyma matanga malaya (Pendlebury, 1933)
Athyma nefte (Cramer, [1780])
Athyma nefte asita Moore, 1858
Athyma nefte subrata Moore, 1858
Athyma opalina (Kollar, [1844])
Athyma opalina shan (Tytler, 1940)
Athyma opalina parajina Fruhstorfer, 1902
Athyma orientalis (Elwes, 1888)
Athyma perius perius (Linnaeus, 1758)
Athyma pravara Moore, 1857
Athyma pravara indosinica Fruhstorfer, 1906
Athyma pravara helma Fruhstorfer, 1906
Athyma punctata Leech, 1890
Athyma punctata punctata Leech, 1890
Athyma punctata prasobsuki Katayama, 1989
Athyma ranga Moore, [1858]
Athyma ranga ranga Moore, [1858]
Athyma ranga obsolescens (Fruhstorfer, 1906)
Athyma reta reta Moore, 1858
Athyma selenophora (Kollar, [1844])
Athyma selenophora amhara Druce, 1873
Athyma selenophora amharina (Moore, [1898])
Athyma selenophora bahula Moore, 1858
Athyma selenophora batilda Fruhstorfer, 1908
Athyma sulpitia sulpitia (Cramer, [1779])
Athyma sulpitia adamsoni (Moore, 1898)
Athyma zeroca Moore, 1872
Athyma whitei (Tytler, 1940)
Athyma zeroca galaesus (Fruhstorfer, 1912)
Athyma zeroca meinippus (Fruhstorfer, 1912)

genus: Limenitis
Limenitis sulpitia sulpitia (Cramer, [1779])
Limenitis mimica Poujade, 1885
Limenitis mimica ueharai (Tateishi, 1999)
Limenitis mimica ngoclinensis Monastyrskii, Devyatkin & Hong, 2000

genus: Parthenos
Parthenos sylla (Donovan, 1798)
Parthenos sylla apicalis Moore, [1879]
Parthenos sylla lilacinus Butler, [1879]

genus: Lebadea
Lebadea martha (Fabricius, 1787)
Lebadea martha martha (Fabricius, 1787)
Lebadea martha malayana Fruhstorfer, [1902]

genus: Sumalia
Sumalia daraxa daraxa (Doubleday, [1848])
Sumalia zulema (Doubleday & Hewitson, 1848)

genus: Parasarpa
Parasarpa dudu dudu (Doubleday, 1848)
Parasarpa zayla kawasakii Funahashi, 2003
Parasarpa houlberti Oberthur, 1913

genus: Bhagadatta
Bhagadatta austenia (Moore, 1872)
Bhagadatta austenia austenia (Moore, 1872)
Bhagadatta austenia violetta Miyata & Yoshida, 1995

genus: Auzakia
Auzakia danava danava (Moore, [1858])

genus: Pandita
Pandita sinope sinope Moore, [1858]

genus: Moduza
Moduza procris (Cramer, [1777])
Moduza procris procris (Cramer, [1777])
Moduza procris milonia (Fruhstorfer, 1906)

genus: Abrota
Abrota ganga flavina Mell, 1923

genus: Neurosigma
Neurosigma siva nonius de Niceville, 1896

genus: Tanaecia
Tanaecia aruna aruna (Felder & Felder, 1860)
Tanaecia clathrata violaria Butler, 1869
Tanaecia jahnu (Moore, [1858])
Tanaecia julii (Lesson, 1837)
Tanaecia julii odilina (Fruhstorfer, 1913)
Tanaecia julii xiphiones (Butler, [1869])
Tanaecia julii mansori Yokochi, 1993
Tanaecia munda waterstradti Corbet, 1941
Tanaecia palguna consanguinea Distant, 1886
Tanaecia pelea pelea (Fabricius, 1787)

genus: Cynitia
Cynitia cocytina puseda (Moore, [1858])
Cynitia cocytus (Fabricius, 1787)
Cynitia cocytus cocytus (Fabricius, 1787)
Cynitia cocytus ambrysus (Fruhstorfer, 1913)
Cynitia flora andersonii (Moore, 1884)
Cynitia godartii asoka (Felder & Felder, [1867])
Cynitia lepidea (Butler, 1868)
Cynitia lepidea sthavara (Fruhstorfer, 1913)
Cynitia lepidea cognata (Moore, [1897])
Cynitia lepidea flaminia (Fruhstorfer, 1905)
Cynitia shigehoi Saito & Saito, 2010
Cynitia stellata Saito, 2004
Cynitia telchinia telchinia (Menetries, 1857)
Cynitia whiteheadi (Crowley, 1900)
Cynitia whiteheadi whiteheadi (Crowley, 1900)

genus: Euthalia
Euthalia aconthea (Cramer, 1777)
Euthalia aconthea garuda (Moore, [1858])
Euthalia aconthea gurda Fruhstorfer, 1906
Euthalia adonia beata Fruhstorfer, 1905
Euthalia agnis hiyamai Yokochi & Matsuda, 1999
Euthalia alboapicala Monastyrskii, 2005
Euthalia alpheda Godart, 1824
Euthalia alpheda verena Fruhstorfer, 1912
Euthalia alpheda yamuna Fruhstorfer, 1906
Euthalia anosia (Moore, 1857)
Euthalia anosia anosia (Moore, [1858])
Euthalia anosia bunaya Fruhstorfer, 1913
Euthalia bunzoi bunzoi Sugiyama, 1996
Euthalia byakko Uehara & Yoshida, 1995
Euthalia confucius gibbsi Monastyrskii & Devyatkin, 2003
Euthalia djata Distant & Pryer, 1887
Euthalia djata siamica Riley & Godfrey, 1925
Euthalia djata osadai Yokochi, 1999
Euthalia duda bellula Yokochi, 2005
Euthalia dunya dunya (Doubleday, [1848])
Euthalia eriphylae de Niceville, 1891
Euthalia eriphylae eriphylae de Niceville, 1891
Euthalia eriphylae chula Fruhstorfer, 1905
Euthalia eriphylae lioneli Fruhstorfer, 1905
Euthalia eriphylae raya Eliot, 1960
Euthalia evelina (Stoll, 1790)
Euthalia evelina annamita (Moore, 1879)
Euthalia evelina compta (Fruhstorfer, 1899)
Euthalia evelina vallona (Fruhstorfer, 1913)
Euthalia franciae raja (Felder & Felder, 1859)
Euthalia hebe tsuchiyai Yokochi, 2005
Euthalia hoa Monastyrskii, 2005
Euthalia ipona Fruhstorfer, 1913
Euthalia iva buensis Monastyrskii, Nguyen & Yokochi, 2000
Euthalia kanda (Moore, 1859)
Euthalia kanda elicius de Niceville, 1890
Euthalia kanda marana Corbet, 1937
Euthalia khambournei khambournei Uehara & Yokochi, 2001
Euthalia lubentina (Cramer, [1777])
Euthalia lubentina lubentina (Cramer, [1777])
Euthalia lubentina chersonesia Fruhstorfer, 1904
Euthalia mahadeva (Moore, 1859)
Euthalia mahadeva binghamii de Niceville, 1895
Euthalia mahadeva zichrina Fruhstorfer, 1904
Euthalia malaccana malaccana Fruhstofer, 1899
Euthalia merta (Moore, 1859)
Euthalia merta merta (Moore, 1859)
Euthalia merta milleri Pendlebury, 1939
Euthalia monina (Fabricius, 1787)
Euthalia monina monina (Fabricius, 1787)
Euthalia monina kesava (Moore, 1859)
Euthalia nara (Moore, 1859)
Euthalia nara shania Evans, 1924
Euthalia nara kalawrica Tytler, 1940
Euthalia omeia Leech, 1891
Euthalia pacifica masaokai Yokochi, 2005
Euthalia patala taooana (Moore, [1879])
Euthalia phemius phemius (Doubleday, [1848])
Euthalia pratti occidentalis Hall, 1930
Euthalia pyrhha ueharai Yokochi, 2005
Euthalia recta monilis (Moore, [1897])
Euthalia sahadeva narayana Grose-Smith & Kirby, 1891
Euthalia saitaphernes Fruhstorfer, 1913
Euthalia saitaphernes saitaphernes Fruhstorfer, 1913
Euthalia saitaphernes tamamitsui Saito & Inayoshi, 2009
Euthalia shinkaii Yokochi, 2004
Euthalia strephon haradai Yokochi, 1996
Euthalia strephonida Monastyrskii, 2005
Euthalia suprema Uehara & Yokochi, 2001
Euthalia teuta (Doubleday, 1848)
Euthalia teuta teuta (Doubleday, 1848)
Euthalia teuta gupta (de Niceville, 1886)
Euthalia teuta goodrichi Distant, 1886
Euthalia teuta rayana Morishita, 1968
Euthalia tinna paupera Fruhstorfer, 1906
Euthalia whiteheadi Grose-Smith, 1889
Euthalia whiteheadi whiteheadi Grose-Smith, 1889
Euthalia whiteheadi miyazakii Saito & Saito, 2003

genus: Lexias
Lexias albopunctata (Crowley, 1895)
Lexias albopunctata albopunctata (Crowley, 1895)
Lexias albopunctata borealis Hanafusa, 1990
Lexias albopunctata exarchus Fruhstorfer, 1914
Lexias bangkana johorensis Tsukada, 1991
Lexias canescens pardalina (Staudinger, 1886)
Lexias cyanipardus grandis Yokochi, 1991
Lexias dirtea (Fabricius, 1793)
Lexias dirtea agosthena (Fruhstorfer, 1914)
Lexias dirtea merguia (Tytler, 1926)
Lexias dirtea bontouxi (Vitalis de Salvaza, 1924)
Lexias pardalis (Moore, 1878)
Lexias pardalis eleanor (Fruhstorfer, 1898)
Lexias pardalis jadeitina (Fruhstorfer, 1913)
Lexias pardalis dirteana (Corbet, 1941)

subfamily: Apaturinae

genus: Chitoria
Chitoria cooperi (Tytler, 1926)
Chitoria naga (Tytler, 1914)
Chitoria sordida sordida (Moore, 1865)
Chitoria sordida vietnamica Nguyen, 1979
Chitoria ulupi ulupi (Doherty, 1889)
Chitoria ulupi kalaurica Tytler, 1926

genus: Dilipa
Dilipa morgiana (Westwood, [1850])

genus: Eulaceura
Eulaceura osteria (Westwood, [1850])
Eulaceura osteria sitarama Fruhstorfer, 1913
Eulaceura osteria kumana Fruhstorfer, 1913
Eulaceura manipuriensis Tytler, 1915

genus: Euripus
Euripus consimilis consimilis (Westwood, 1850)
Euripus consimilis eurinus Fruhstorfer, 1903
Euripus consimilis yunnanensis Chou, Yuan, Yin, Zhang & Chen, 2002
Euripus nyctelius nyctelius (Doubleday, 1845)
Euripus nyctelius mastor Fruhstorfer, 1903
Euripus nyctelius euploeoides C. & R. Felder, [1867]

genus: Helcyra
Helcyra hemina hemina Hewitson, 1864
Helcyra miyamotoi Koiwaya, 2003
Helcyra subalba (Poujade, 1885)
Helcyra superba superba Leech, 1890
Herona marathus Doubleday, [1848]

genus: Herona
Herona marathus marathus Doubleday, [1848]
Herona marathus angustata Moore, [1879]
Herona marathus marathon Fruhstorfer, 1906
Herona marathus stellaris Tsukada, 1991
Herona sumatrana dusuntua Corbet, 1937

genus: Hestina
Hestina assimilis assimilis (Linnaeus, 1758)
Hestina mena Moore, 1858
Hestina mimetica Butler, 1874
Hestina nama (Doubleday, 1845)
Hestina nama nama (Doubleday, 1845)
Hestina nicevillei magna Omoto & Funahashi, 2004
Hestina persimilis persimilis (Westwood, [1850])

genus: Rohana
Rohana nakula (Moore, [1858])
Rohana nakula bernardii Nguyen-Phung, 1985
Rohana nakula thantoana Kimura, 1994
Rohana parisatis (Westwood, [1850])
Rohana parisatis staurakius (Fruhstorfer, 1913)
Rohana parisatis pseudosiamensis Nguyen-Phung, 1985
Rohana parvata burmana (Tytler, 1940)
Rohana tonkiniana Fruhstorfer, 1906
Rohana tonkiniana tonkiniana Fruhstorfer, 1906
Rohana tonkiniana siamensis (Fruhstorfer, 1913)

genus: Mimathyma
Mimathyma ambica (Kollar, [1844])
Mimathyma ambica miranda (Fruhstorfer, 1902)
Mimathyma ambica claribella (Fruhstorfer, 1902)
Mimathyma chevana chevana (Moore, [1866])

genus: Sasakia
Sasakia charonda yunnanensis Fruhstorfer, 1913
Sasakia funeblis funeblis (Leech, 1891)

genus: Sephisa
Sephisa chandra (Moore, [1858])
Sephisa chandra chandra (Moore, [1858])
Sephisa chandra stubbsi Corbet, 1941

subfamily: Cyrestinae
genus: Chersonesia
Chersonesia intermedia Martin, 1895
Chersonesia intermedia intermedia Martin, 1895
Chersonesia intermedia rahrioides Moore, [1899]
Chersonesia nicevillei Martin, 1895
Chersonesia peraka peraka Distant, 1884
Chersonesia rahria rahria (Moore, [1858])
Chersonesia risa risa (Doubleday, [1848])

genus: Cyrestis
Cyrestis cocles (Fabricius, 1787)
Cyrestis cocles cocles (Fabricius, 1787)
Cyrestis cocles earli Distant, 1883
Cyrestis maenalis martini Hartert, 1902
Cyrestis nivea (Zinken, 1831)
Cyrestis nivea nivalis Felder & Felder, [1867]
Cyrestis nivea tonkiniana Fruhstorfer, 1901
Cyrestis themire Honrath, 1884
Cyrestis themire themire Honrath, 1884
Cyrestis themire vatinia Fruhstorfer, 1901
Cyrestis thyodamas thyodamas Doyere, [1840]

genus: Dichorragia
Dichorragia nesimachus (Doyere, [1840])
Dichorragia nesimachus nesimachus (Doyere, [1840])
Dichorragia nesimachus machates Fruhstorfer, 1903

genus: Pseudergolis
Pseudergolis wedah wedah (Kollar, [1844])

genus: Stibochiona
Stibochiona nicea (Gray, 1846)
Stibochiona nicea nicea (Gray, 1846)
Stibochiona nicea subucula Fruhstorfer, [1898]

subfamily: Biblidinae

genus: Ariadne
Ariadne ariadne pallidior (Fruhstorfer, 1899)
Ariadne specularia arca (Fruhstorfer, 1906)
Ariadne merione (Cramer, [1777])
Ariadne merione tapestrina (Moore, 1884)
Ariadne merione ginosa (Fruhstorfer, 1912)
Ariadne isaeus isaeus (Wallace, 1869)

genus: Laringa
Laringa castelnaui castelnaui (Felder & Felder, 1860)
Laringa horsfieldii glaucescens (de Niceville, 1895)

subfamily: Calinaginae

genus: Calinaga
Calinaga aborica Tytler, 1915
Calinaga buddha avalokita Fruhstorfer, 1914
Calinaga funeralis Monastyrskii & Devyatkin, 2000
Calinaga lhatso Oberthür, 1893
Calinaga sudassana Melville, 1893
Calinaga sudassana sudassana Melville, 1893
Calinaga sudassana distans Monastyrskii & Devyatkin, 2000

subfamily: Charaxinae

genus: Agatasa
Agatasa calydonia (Hewitson, [1854])
Agatasa calydonia calydonia (Hewitson, [1854])
Agatasa calydonia belisama (Crowley, 1891)

genus: Charaxes
Charaxes aristogiton (Felder & Felder, [1867])
Charaxes aristogiton aristogiton Felder & Felder, [1867]
Charaxes aristogiton peridoneus Fruhstorfer, 1914
Charaxes bernardus (Fabricius, 1793)
Charaxes bernardus agna Moore, 1878
Charaxes bernardus hierax Felder & Felder, [1867]
Charaxes bernardus crepax Fruhstorfer, 1914
Charaxes bernardus mahawedi Fruhstorfer, 1914
Charaxes borneensis praestantius Fruhstorfer, 1914
Charaxes durnfordi distanti Distant, 1884
Charaxes durnfordi merguia Tytler, 1926
Charaxes durnfordi nicholi (Grose-Smith, 1886)
Charaxes distanti distanti Honrath, 1885
Charaxes harmodius Felder & Felder, [1867]
Charaxes harmodius maruyamai Hanafusa, 1987
Charaxes harmodius martinus Rothschild, 1900
Charaxes harmodius shiloi Hanafusa, 1994
Charaxes kahruba (Moore, [1895])
Charaxes marmax Westwood, [1847]
Charaxes marmax marmax Westwood, [1847]
Charaxes marmax philopator Fruhstorfer, 1914
Charaxes marmax philosarcus Fruhstorfer, 1914
Charaxes solon sulphureus Rothschild, 1900
Charaxes solon cunctator Fruhstorfer, 1914
Charaxes solon echo Butler, 1867

genus: Polyura
Polyura athamas athamas (Drury, [1773])
Polyura athamas agrarius (Swinhoe, 1887)
Polyura athamas uraeus (Rothschild, 1899)
Polyura arja arja (Felder & Felder, [1867])
Polyura delphis (Doubleday, 1843)
Polyura delphis delphis (Doubleday, 1843)
Polyura delphis concha (Vollenhoeven, 1861)
Polyura dolon grandis (Rothschiled & Jordan, 1898)
Polyura eudamippus (Doubleday, 1843)
Polyura eudamippus nigrobasalis (Lathy, 1898)
Polyura eudamippus peninsularis (Pendlebury, 1933)
Polyura eudamippus jamblichus (Fruhstorfer, 1914)
Polyura eudamippus splendens (Tytler, 1940)
Polyura hebe chersonesus (Fruhstorfer, 1898)
Polyura hebe plautus (Fruhstorfer, 1898)
Polyura hebe takizawai Hanafusa, 1987
Polyura jalysus jalysus (Felder & Felder, [1867])
Polyura moori Distant, 1883
Polyura moori moori (Distant, 1883)
Polyura moori sandakana (Fruhstorfer, 1895)
Polyura narcaeus thawgawa Tytler, 1940
Polyura nepenthes nepenthes (Grose-Smith, 1883)
Polyura schreiber (Godart, [1824])
Polyura schreiber assamensis (Rothschild & Jordan, 1898)
Polyura schreiber tisamenus (Fruhstorfer, 1914)

genus: Prothoe
Prothoe franck (Godart, [1824])
Prothoe franck uniformis Butler, 1885
Prothoe franck angelica Butler, 1885
Prothoe franck vilma Fruhstorfer, [1902]
Prothoe franck nausikaa Fruhstorfer, 1901

subfamily: Danainae

tribe: Danaini

genus: Danaus
Danaus affinis malayanus Fruhstorfer 1899
Danaus chrysippus chrysippus(Linnaeus, 1758) – plain tiger
Danaus genutia genutia (Cramer, 1779) – common tiger
Danaus melanippus hegesippus (Cramer, [1777])

genus: Idea
Idea agamarschana hadeni (Wood-Mason & de Niceville, 1880)
Idea hypermnestra linteata (Butler, [1879])
Idea leuconoe Erichson, 1834
Idea leuconoe chersonesia (Fruhstorfer, 1898)
Idea leuconoe siamensis (Godfrey, 1916)
Idea stolli logani (Moore, 1883)
Idea lynceus lynceus (Drury, 1773)

genus: Ideopsis
Ideopsis gaura perakana (Fruhstorfer, [1899]
Ideopsis gaura kajangensis Okubo, 1983
Ideopsis juventa sitah (Fruhstorfer, 1904)
Ideopsis similis persimilis (Moore, 1879) (Linnaeus, 1758) – Ceylon blue glassy tiger
Ideopsis vulgaris (Butler, 1874)
Ideopsis vulgaris macrina (Fruhstorfer, 1904)
Ideopsis vulgaris contigua Talbot, 1939

genus: Parantica
Parantica agleoides agleoides (Felder & Felder, 1860)
Parantica aglea melanoides Moore, 1883 – glassy tiger
Parantica aspasia aspasia (Fabricius, 1787)
Parantica luzonensis aurensis Eliot, 1978
Parantica melaneus (Cramer, [1775])
Parantica melaneus sinopion (Fruhstorfer, 1910)
Parantica sita (Kollar, [1844]) – chestnut tiger
Parantica sita sita (Kollar, [1844])
Parantica sita ethologa (Swinhoe, 1899)
Parantica sita melanosticta Morishita, 1994
Parantica swinhoei (Moore, 1883) – Swinhoe's chocolate tiger
Parantica swinhoe szechuana (Fruhstorfer, 1899)

genus: Tirumala
Tirumala gautama gautama (Moore, 1877)
Tirumala limniace (Cramer, 1775) – blue tiger
Tirumala limniace limniace (Cramer, 1775)
Tirumala limniace exotica (Gmelin, 1790)
Tirumala septentrionis septentrionis (Butler, 1874) – dark blue tiger

tribe: Euploeini

genus: Euploea
Euploea alcathoe (Godart, 1819)
Euploea algea menetriesii C. & R. Felder, 1860
Euploea algea deione Westwood, 1848
Euploea algea limborgii Moore, [1879]Euploea camaralzeman Butler, 1866
Euploea camaralzeman camaralzeman Butler, 1866
Euploea camaralzeman malayica (Butler, 1878)
Euploea camaralzeman paraclaudina Pendlebury, 1939
Euploea conbuom (Saito & Inayoshi, 2006
Euploea core godartii Lucas, 1853 – common Indian crow
Euploea core graminifera (Moore, 1883)
Euploea core vermiculata Butler, 1866
Euploea crameri bremeri C. & R. Felder, 1860
Euploea crameri crameri Lucas, 1853
Euploea crameri praedicabilis Fruhstorfer, 1914
Euploea doubledayi C. & R. Felder, [1865]
Euploea doubledayi evalida (Swinhoe, 1899)
Euploea eyndhovii gardineri (Fruhstorfer, 1898)
Euploea eunice (Godart, 1819)
Euploea eunice leucogonis (Butler, [1879])
Euploea eunice coelestis (Fruhstorfer, [1902])
Euploea klugii klugii Moore, 1858
Euploea klugii erichsonii Felder & Felder, [1865]
Euploea midamus chloe (Guerin-Meneville, 1843)
Euploea midamus singapura (Moore, 1883)
Euploea modesta modesta Butler, 1866
Euploea modesta tiomana Corbet, 1937
Euploea mulciber mulciber Fruhstorfer, 1904 – striped blue crow
Euploea phaenareta (Schaller, 1785)
Euploea phaenareta castelnaui Felder & Felder, [1865]
Euploea phaenareta drucei Moore, 1883
Euploea radamanthus radamanthus (Fabricius, 1793)
Euploea sylvester harrisii Felder & Felder, [1865]
Euploea sylvester tyrianthina (Moore, 1883)
Euploea tulliolus (Fabricius, 1793)
Euploea tulliolus ledereri Felder & Felder, 1860
Euploea tulliolus dehaani Lucas, 1853
Euploea tulliolus aristotelis (Moore, 1883)

subfamily: Satyrinae
genus: Melanitis
Melanitis leda leda (Linnaeus, 1758)
Melanitis phedima (Cramer, [1780])
Melanitis phedima abdullae Distant, 1883
Melanitis phedima ganapati Fruhstorfer, 1908
Melanitis zitenius auletes Fruhstorfer, 1908
genus: Cyllogenes
Cyllogenes janetae orientalis Monastyrskii, 2005
Cyllogenes milleri Monastyrskii, 2005
genus: Elymnias
Elymnias casiphone saueri Distant, 1882
Elymnias dara Distnat & Pryer, 1887
Elymnias dara daedalion (de Niceville, 1890)
Elymnias dara darina Fruhstorfer, 1907
Elymnias esaca (Westwood, [1851])
Elymnias esaca esaca (Westwood, [1851])
Elymnias esaca andersonii (Moore, 1886)
Elymnias harterti harterti Honrath, 1889
Elymnias hypermnestra (Linnaeus, 1763)
Elymnias hypermnestra tinctoria Moore, [1879]
Elymnias hypermnestra agina Fruhstorfer, [1902]
Elymnias hypermnestra tonkiniana Fruhstorfer, [1902]
Elymnias hypermnestra meridionalis Fruhstorfer, 1902
Elymnias hypermnestra robinsona Monastyrskii & Devyatkin, 2003
Elymnias malelas malelas (Hewitson, [1863])
Elymnias miyagawai Saito & Kishi, 2012
Elymnias nesaea (Linnaeus, 1764)
Elymnias nesaea timandra Wallace, 1869
Elymnias nesaea apelles Fruhstorfer, 1902
Elymnias nesaea lioneli Fruhstorfer, 1907
Elymnias obnubila Marshall & de Niceville, 1883
Elymnias panthera panthera (Fabricius, 1787)
Elymnias patna (Westwood, [1851])
Elymnias patna stictica Fruhstorfer, [1902]
Elymnias penanga (Westwood, [1851])
Elymnias penanga penanga (Westwood, [1851])
Elymnias penanga chelensis de Niceville, 1890
Elymnias saola Monastyrskii, 2004
Elymnias vasudeva Moore, [1858]
genus: Lethe
Lethe berdievi Monastyrskii, 2005
Lethe bhairava (Moore, [1858])
Lethe camilla Leech, 1891
Lethe chandica (Moore, 1858)
Lethe chandica chandica (Moore, [1858])
Lethe chandica suvarna Fruhstorfer, 1908
Lethe confusa confusa Aurivillius, [1898]
Lethe distans Butler, 1870
Lethe dura (Marshall, 1882)
Lethe dura dura (Marshall, 1882)
Lethe dura mansonia Fruhstorfer, 1911
Lethe europa (Fabricius, 1775)
Lethe europa niladana Fruhstorfer, 1911
Lethe europa malaya Corbet, 1941
Lethe gemina yao Sugiyama, 1996
Lethe goalpara goalpara (Moore, 1865)
Lethe gulnihal peguana (Moore, [1892])
Lethe hecate zao Yoshino, 2008
Lethe huongii Monastyrskii, 2004
Lethe kansa kansa (Moore, 1857)
Lethe konkakini Monastyrskii & Devyatkin, 2000
Lethe kondoi Uémura, 1997
Lethe insana insana (Kollar, [1844])
Lethe lanaris exista Yoshino, 2008
Lethe latiaris perimele Fruhstorfer, 1911
Lethe mekara (Moore, [1858])
Lethe mekara crijnana Fruhstorfer, 1911
Lethe mekara gopaka Fruhstorfer, 1911
Lethe melisana Monastyrskii, 2005
Lethe minerva tritogeneia Fruhstorfer, 1911
Lethe naga Doherty, 1889
Lethe nicetas nicetas (Hewitson, [1863])
Lethe ocellata mon Yoshino, 2008
Lethe philemon Fruhstorfer, [1902]
Lethe philesana Monastyrskii & Devyatkin, 2000
Lethe philesanoides Monastyrskii & Devyatkin, 2003
Lethe rohria rohria (Fabricius, 1787)
Lethe scanda (Moore, 1857)
Lethe serbonis (Hewitson, 1876)
Lethe siderea siderea Marshall, [1880]
Lethe sidonis sidonis (Hewitson, [1863])
Lethe sinorix sinorix (Hewitson, [1863])
Lethe sura (Doubleday, 1849)
Lethe syrcis diunaga (Fruhstorfer, 1911)
Lethe umedai Koiwaya, 1998
Lethe verma stenopa Fruhstorfer, 1908
Lethe vindhya vindhya (Felder & Felder, 1859)
Lethe violaceopicta (Poujade, 1884)
genus: Neope
Neope armandii armandii (Oberthur, 1876)
Neope bhadra (Moore, [1858])
Neope muirheadi (Felder & Felder, 1862)
Neope muirheadi bhima Marshall, [1881]
Neope muirheadi lahittei (Janet, 1894)
Neope pulaha pulahoides (Moore, [1892])
Neope oberthueri Leech, 1891
Neope yama (Moore, [1858])
Neope yama yama (Moore, [1858])
Neope yama kinpingensis Lee, 1962
genus: Orinoma
Orinoma damaris damaris Gray, 1846
genus: Mandarinia
Mandarinia regalis baronesa Fruhstorfer, 1906
genus: Callarge
Callarge occidentalis fansipana Monastyrskii, 2005
genus: Neorina
Neorina crishna archaica Fruhstorfer, 1911
Neorina lowii neophyta Fruhstorfer, 1911
Neorina neosinica Lee, 1985
Neorina patria westwoodii Moore, [1891]
genus: Ethope
Ethope himachala (Moore, 1857)
Ethope diademoides (Moore, [1879])
Ethope diademoides attapeuensis Nakamura & Wakahara, 2008
Ethope diademoides diademoides (Moore, [1879])
Ethope diademoides hislopi Corbet, 1948
Ethope diademoides metayei Monastyrskii & Devyatkin, 2003
Ethope noirei (Janet, 1896)
genus: Xanthotaenia
Xanthotaenia busiris busiris (Westwood, [1858])
genus: Penthema
Penthema lisarda michallati Janet, 1894 )
Penthema darlisa Moore, 1879 )
Penthema darlisa mimetica Lathy, 1900
Penthema darlisa melema Riley & Godfrey, 1921
Penthema darlisa merguia Evans, 1924)
genus: Orsotriaena
Orsotriaena medus medus (Fabricius, 1775)
genus: Mycalesis
Mycalesis adamsonii Watson, 1897
Mycalesis anapita anapita Moore, [1858]
Mycalesis anaxias aemate Fruhstorfer, 1911
Mycalesis anaxioides Marshall, 1883
Mycalesis annamitica Fruhstorfer, 1906
Mycalesis annamitica annamitica Fruhstorfer, 1906
Mycalesis annamitica mausonia Fruhstorfer, 1906
Mycalesis deficiens Fruhstorfer, 1906
Mycalesis distanti Moore, [1892]
Mycalesis fusca fusca (Felder & Felder, 1860)
Mycalesis francisca (Cramer, 1782)
Mycalesis francisca ulia Fruhstorfer, 1908
Mycalesis francisca sanatanaMoore, [1858]
Mycalesis gotama charaka Moore, [1875]
Mycalesis inayoshii Aoki & Yamaguchi, 1995
Mycalesis inopia Fruhstorfer, 1908
Mycalesis intermedia (Moore, [1892])
Mycalesis janardana sagittigera Fruhstorfer, 1908
Mycalesis lepcha kohimensis Tytler, 1914
Mycalesis maianeas maianeas Hewitson, [1864]
Mycalesis malsara Moore, [1858]
Mycalesis mineus (Linnaeus, 1758)
Mycalesis mineus mineus (Linnaeus, 1758)
Mycalesis mineus macromalayanaFruhstorfer, 1911
Mycalesis misenus de Niceville, 1889
Mycalesis mnasicles perna Fruhstorfer, 1906
Mycalesis mucianus mucianus Fruhstorfer, 1908
Mycalesis nicotia Westwood, [1850]
Mycalesis oroatis Hewitson, [1864]
Mycalesis oroatis surkha Marshall, 1882
Mycalesis oroatis ustulataDistant, 1885
Mycalesis orseis nautilus Butler, 1867
Mycalesis patiana Eliot, 1969
Mycalesis perseus (Fabricius, 1775)
Mycalesis perseus tabitha (Fabricius, 1793)
Mycalesis perseus cepheus Butler, 1867
Mycalesis perseoides (Moore, [1892])
Mycalesis sangaica tunicula Fruhstorfer, 1911
Mycalesis siamica Riley & Godfrey, 1921
Mycalesis suaveolens duguidi Tytler, 1926
Mycalesis thailandica Aoki & Yamaguchi, 1984
Mycalesis visala Moore, [1858]
Mycalesis visala visala Moore, [1858]
Mycalesis visala phamis Talbot & Corbet, 1939
genus: Coelites
Coelites nothis Westwood, [1851]
Coelites nothis adamsoni Moore, 1891
Coelites nothis nothis Westwood, [1850]
Coelites nothis sylvarum Fruhstorfer, [1902]
Coelites nothis adamsoni Moore, 1891
Coelites enptychioides humilis Butler, 1867
Coelites epiminthia Westwood, [1851]
Coelites epiminthia epiminthia Westwood, [1851]
Coelites epiminthia binghami Moore, 1891
genus: Erites
Erites angularis angularis Moore, [1879]
Erites argentina delia Martin, 1909
Erites falcipennis Wood-Mason & de Niceville, 1883
Erites falcipennis falcipennis Wood-Mason & de Niceville, 1883
Erites medura rotundata de Niceville, 1893
genus: Ragadia
Ragadia critias Riley & Godfrey, 1921
Ragadia makuta siponta Fruhstorfer, 1911
Ragadia crisilda de Niceville, 1892
Ragadia crisilda crisilda de Niceville, 1892
Ragadia crisilda critolaus de Niceville, 1893
genus: Acropolis
Acropolis thalia thalia (Leech, 1891)
genus: Zipaetis
Zipaetis scylax Hewitson, [1863]
Zipaetis unipupillata Lee, 1962
Zipaetis unipupillata unipupillata Lee, 1962
Zipaetis unipupillata annamicus Monastyrskii & Devyatkin, 2000
genus: Ypthima
Ypthima affectata Elwes & Edwards, 1893
Ypthima akbar Talbot, 1947
Ypthima atra Cantlie & Norman, 1959
Ypthima baldus (Fabricius, 1775)
Ypthima baldus baldus (Fabricius, 1775)
Ypthima baldus newboldi Distant, 1882
Ypthima confusa Shirozu & Shima, 1977
Ypthima conjuncta monticola Uémura & Koiwaya, 2000
Ypthima daclaca Uémura & Monastyrskii, 2004
Ypthima dohertyi (Moore, [1893])
Ypthima dohertyi dohertyi (Moore, [1893])
Ypthima dohertyi mossmani Eliot, 1967
Ypthima evansi evansi Eliot, 1967
Ypthima fasciata torone Fruhstorfer, 1911
Ypthima frontierii Uémura & Monastyrskii, 2000
Ypthima huebneri Kirby, 1871
Ypthima iarba de Niceville, 1895
Ypthima imitans Elwes & Edwards, 1893
Ypthima lisandra (Cramer, [1780])
Ypthima lisandra lisandra (Cramer, [1780])
Ypthima lisandra bara Evans, 1923
Ypthima nebulosa Aoki & Uémura, 1982
Ypthima norma Westwood, 1832
Ypthima norma burmana Evans, 1923
Ypthima norma annamitica Fruhstorfer, 1911
Ypthima pandocus corticaria Butler, [1879]
Ypthima persimilis Elwes & Edwards, 1893
Ypthima philomela peguana Evans, 1923
Ypthima praenubila praenubila Leech, 1891
Ypthima pseudosavara Uémura & Monastyrskii, 2000
Ypthima sakra (Moore, [1858])
Ypthima sakra austeni (Moore, [1862])
Ypthima sakra leechi Forster, 1948
Ypthima sarcaposa Fruhstorferi, 1911
Ypthima savara Grose-Smith, 1887
Ypthima savara savara Grose-Smith, 1887
Ypthima savara tonkiniana Fruhstorfer, 1911
Ypthima similis Elwes & Edwards, 1893
Ypthima singorensis Aoki & Uémura, 1984
Ypthima singorensis singorensis Aoki & Uémura, 1984
Ypthima singorensis indosinica Uémura & Monastyrskii, 2004
Ypthima tappana selinuntioides Mell, 1942
Ypthima sobrina Elwes & Edwards, 1893
Ypthima watsoni (Moore, [1893])
Ypthima watsoni watsoni (Moore, [1893])
Ypthima watsoni peninsulae Aoki & Uémura, 1984
Ypthima watsoni inouei Shirozu & Shima, 1977
Ypthima yunosukei Aoki & Uémura, 1984
genus: Callerebia
Callerebia annada orixa Moore, 1872
Callerebia narasingha dohertyi (Evans, 1923)
Callerebia suroia Tytler, 1914
genus: Aulocera
Aulocera loha Doherty, 1886

subfamily: Libytheinae

genus: Libythea
Libythea celtis formosana Fruhstorfer, 1909
Libythea geoffroy philippina Staudinger, 1889

See also
 
 List of butterflies of China (Palearctic and Indomalayan realms)
 List of butterflies of Peninsular Malaysia (Indomalayan realm)
 List of butterflies of Singapore (Indomalayan realm)
 List of butterflies of the Philippines (Palearctic and Indomalayan realms)
 List of butterflies of Sulawesi (Australasian realm)
 List of butterflies of Papua New Guinea (Australasian realm)

References

Bernard D'Abrera Butterflies of the Oriental Region. Part 1 (1981) Papilionidae, Pieridae, Danaidae Part 2 (1983) Nymphalidae, Satyridae, Amathusidae  Part 3 (1986) Lycaenidae, Riodinidae  Hill House Publishers Lansdowne Editions.
Charles Thomas Bingham in William Thomas Blanford Ed. The fauna of British India, including Ceylon and Burma London,Taylor & Francis Volume 1 1905, Volume 2 1907 online
 Cotton, A.M. & T. Racheli, 2007 Preliminary Annotated Checklist of the Papilionidae of Laos with Notes on Taxonomy, Phenology, Distribution and Variation (Lepidoptera, Papilionoidea).Fragmenta Entomologica, Roma, 38(2): 279-378.
Davidson, D.M. & J.J.Macbeth, 1938 The Butterflies of Siam. J. Siam Soc. Nat. Hist. Suppl. 11(2):67-95.
Fleming, W. A., 1975 Butterflies of West Malaysia & Singapore Berkshire, Eng. : Classey Publications Two volumes  (volume 1)
Fruhstorfer, H., 1910 The Indo-Australian Rhopalocera. [Danaidae] in Seitz, A. (ed.). The Macrolepidoptera of the World: a systematic description of the hitherto known macrolepidoptera. Stuttgart : Alfred Kernen Vol. 9 1197 pp.
Fruhstorfer, H., 1911. Appendix to Danaidae in Seitz, A. (ed.). The Macrolepidoptera of the World. 9. The Indo-Australian Rhopalocera. 2 vols. Stuttgart : Alfred Kernen Verlag viii+1197 pp.
Fruhstorfer, H., 1911. The Indo-Australian Rhopalocera. [Amathusiidae]. pp. 403–448 in Seitz, A. (ed.). The Macrolepidoptera of the World: a systematic description of the hitherto known macrolepidoptera. Stuttgart : Alfred Kernen Vol. 9 1197 pp.
Fruhstorfer, H., 1911. The Indo-Australian Rhopalocera. [Satyridae]. 285-401 pls 87-99 in Seitz, A. (ed.). The Macrolepidoptera of the World: a systematic description of the hitherto known macrolepidoptera. Stuttgart : Alfred Kernen Vol. 9 1197 pp. 
Fruhstorfer, H., 1912. The Indo-Australian Rhopalocera. [Nymphalidae]. 453-536, 545-560 pls 115, 119, 123-138 in Seitz, A. (ed.). The Macrolepidoptera of the World: a systematic description of the hitherto known macrolepidoptera. Stuttgart : Alfred Kernen Vol. 9 1197 pp.
 Fruhstorfer H., 1910 The Indo-Australian Rhopalocera. [ Pieridae] in Seitz, A. (ed.). The Macrolepidoptera of the World: a systematic description of the hitherto known macrolepidoptera. Stuttgart : Alfred Kernen Vol. 9 1197 pp.
Fruhstorfer H., 1915-1924 The Indo-Australian Rhopalocera [Lycaenidae (pars)] in Seitz, A. (ed.). The Macrolepidoptera of the World: a systematic description of the hitherto known macrolepidoptera. Stuttgart : Alfred Kernen Vol. 9 1197 pp.
Hanafusa, H. 1994 Ten new butterflies from Indonesia and Laos (Lepidoptera: Papilionidae, Satyridae, Nymphalidae). Futao 16: 16-20
Jordan, K., 1908-1909 The Indo-Australian Rhopalocera [Papilionidae] in Seitz, A. (ed.). The Macrolepidoptera of the World: a systematic description of the hitherto known macrolepidoptera. Stuttgart : Alfred Kernen Vol. 9 1197 pp.
Kimura, Y., T.Aoki, S.Yamaguchi, Y.Uémura, & T.Saito., 2011 The Butterflies of Thailand. Based on Yunosuke KIMURA Collection vol.1. Hesperiidae, Papilionidae, Pieridae.Mokuyosha. (220pp)
Hanafusa, H., 1987: New Subspecies of Charaxes, Polyura and Moduza from South East Asia.Iwase 4:14-37, 4 pls.
George Frederick Leycester Marshall and Lionel de Nicéville The butterflies of India, Burmah and Ceylon. A descriptive handbook of all the known species of rhopalocerous Lepidoptera inhabiting that region, with notices of allied species occurring in the neighbouring countries along the border; with numerous illustrations.Calcutta:Central Press Co., ld., 1882-90. online
Murayama, S. and Kimura, Y., 1990 : Some new butterflies from Thailand. Nature and Insects 25(2):19-24, figs.1-23. 
Alexander L. Monastyrskii Butterflies of Vietnam Vol. 1 (2005) Nymphalidae: Satyrinae. Vol. 2 (2007) Papilionidae . Vol. 3 (2011) Nymphalidae: Danainae, Amathusiinae. 2011. .[Hanoi] Dolphin Media Co., [Hanoi], Vietnam-Russia Research Tropical Centre. 
 Alexander L. Monastyrskii and Alexey L Devyatkin Butterflies of Vietnam: An Illustrated Checklist 
Motono, A & N. Negishi, 1989 Butterflies of Laos. (in Japanese) Kirihara Shoten, Tokyo. 215pp.
Okubo, 1983 Butterflies of Tioman Island, West Malaysia, with the description of new species Tyô to Ga 33 (3,4): 168-184
Seitz, A., 1924-1927 The Indo-Australian Rhopalocera [Lycaenidae (pars)] in Seitz, A. (ed.). The Macrolepidoptera of the World: a systematic description of the hitherto known macrolepidoptera. Stuttgart : Alfred Kernen Vol. 9 1197 pp.
Talbot, G. (1939) The fauna of British India, including Ceylon and Burma Papilionidae, Pieridae xxix + 600 p - 184 figs - 1 folding map - 3 col. pl. Butterflies. Vol. 1 online
 Talbot, G. (1947) The fauna of British India, including Ceylon and Burma Danaidae, Satyridae, Amathusiidae and Acraeidae. xv + 506 p - 104 figs - 2 col. pl.Butterflies. Vol. 2 online
 Woodfield, E. & R. Murton, 2006 Butterfly Field Guide Southwest Cambodia. Frontier-Cambodia.
Papers published in "Butterflies (Teinopalpus)" Journal of The Butterfly Society of Japan List 
Key papers listed by author at Wikispecies are by: Edward John Godfrey, Yunosuke Kimura, Henry Maurice Pendlebury, Alexander Steven Corbet, Osamu Yata, Takashi Shirôzu, John Nevill Eliot, Amnuay Pinratan, Yunosuke Kimura, Kotaro Saito, Yasuo Seki, papers by Japanese authors in Yadoriga (Entomological Society of Japan) online and open access)

External links
Check List of Butterflies in Indo-China
Futao Series website
Tyô-to-Ga Series website – (open access).
Wikispecies: main search page – taxonomy via (butterfly) genus &/or species.

 
Butterflies
butterflies01
Indochina
Butterflies of Indochina
01